

118001–118100 

|-bgcolor=#E9E9E9
| 118001 || 1147 T-2 || — || September 29, 1973 || Palomar || PLS || — || align=right | 2.2 km || 
|-id=002 bgcolor=#E9E9E9
| 118002 || 1172 T-2 || — || September 29, 1973 || Palomar || PLS || — || align=right | 3.9 km || 
|-id=003 bgcolor=#fefefe
| 118003 || 1190 T-2 || — || September 29, 1973 || Palomar || PLS || NYS || align=right | 1.3 km || 
|-id=004 bgcolor=#E9E9E9
| 118004 || 1192 T-2 || — || September 29, 1973 || Palomar || PLS || — || align=right | 5.1 km || 
|-id=005 bgcolor=#d6d6d6
| 118005 || 1214 T-2 || — || September 30, 1973 || Palomar || PLS || HYG || align=right | 4.0 km || 
|-id=006 bgcolor=#E9E9E9
| 118006 || 1252 T-2 || — || September 29, 1973 || Palomar || PLS || — || align=right | 2.5 km || 
|-id=007 bgcolor=#fefefe
| 118007 || 1256 T-2 || — || September 29, 1973 || Palomar || PLS || — || align=right | 1.6 km || 
|-id=008 bgcolor=#E9E9E9
| 118008 || 1257 T-2 || — || September 29, 1973 || Palomar || PLS || — || align=right | 3.5 km || 
|-id=009 bgcolor=#fefefe
| 118009 || 1271 T-2 || — || September 29, 1973 || Palomar || PLS || MAS || align=right | 1.5 km || 
|-id=010 bgcolor=#fefefe
| 118010 || 1272 T-2 || — || September 29, 1973 || Palomar || PLS || — || align=right | 1.9 km || 
|-id=011 bgcolor=#fefefe
| 118011 || 1289 T-2 || — || September 29, 1973 || Palomar || PLS || NYS || align=right | 1.1 km || 
|-id=012 bgcolor=#E9E9E9
| 118012 || 1313 T-2 || — || September 29, 1973 || Palomar || PLS || — || align=right | 2.3 km || 
|-id=013 bgcolor=#E9E9E9
| 118013 || 1338 T-2 || — || September 29, 1973 || Palomar || PLS || — || align=right | 4.7 km || 
|-id=014 bgcolor=#fefefe
| 118014 || 1342 T-2 || — || September 29, 1973 || Palomar || PLS || — || align=right | 1.5 km || 
|-id=015 bgcolor=#d6d6d6
| 118015 || 1430 T-2 || — || September 30, 1973 || Palomar || PLS || THM || align=right | 5.1 km || 
|-id=016 bgcolor=#d6d6d6
| 118016 || 1437 T-2 || — || September 30, 1973 || Palomar || PLS || — || align=right | 6.0 km || 
|-id=017 bgcolor=#d6d6d6
| 118017 || 1448 T-2 || — || September 30, 1973 || Palomar || PLS || KOR || align=right | 2.8 km || 
|-id=018 bgcolor=#d6d6d6
| 118018 || 1496 T-2 || — || September 29, 1973 || Palomar || PLS || THM || align=right | 3.8 km || 
|-id=019 bgcolor=#d6d6d6
| 118019 || 1504 T-2 || — || September 30, 1973 || Palomar || PLS || KOR || align=right | 2.5 km || 
|-id=020 bgcolor=#d6d6d6
| 118020 || 1602 T-2 || — || September 24, 1973 || Palomar || PLS || HYG || align=right | 6.5 km || 
|-id=021 bgcolor=#fefefe
| 118021 || 2035 T-2 || — || September 29, 1973 || Palomar || PLS || — || align=right | 1.5 km || 
|-id=022 bgcolor=#E9E9E9
| 118022 || 2055 T-2 || — || September 29, 1973 || Palomar || PLS || — || align=right | 5.6 km || 
|-id=023 bgcolor=#fefefe
| 118023 || 2103 T-2 || — || September 29, 1973 || Palomar || PLS || FLO || align=right | 1.2 km || 
|-id=024 bgcolor=#d6d6d6
| 118024 || 2110 T-2 || — || September 29, 1973 || Palomar || PLS || EMA || align=right | 7.0 km || 
|-id=025 bgcolor=#fefefe
| 118025 || 2121 T-2 || — || September 29, 1973 || Palomar || PLS || FLO || align=right | 1.3 km || 
|-id=026 bgcolor=#d6d6d6
| 118026 || 2151 T-2 || — || September 29, 1973 || Palomar || PLS || — || align=right | 6.1 km || 
|-id=027 bgcolor=#d6d6d6
| 118027 || 2161 T-2 || — || September 29, 1973 || Palomar || PLS || — || align=right | 6.0 km || 
|-id=028 bgcolor=#fefefe
| 118028 || 2283 T-2 || — || September 29, 1973 || Palomar || PLS || — || align=right | 1.2 km || 
|-id=029 bgcolor=#fefefe
| 118029 || 2295 T-2 || — || September 29, 1973 || Palomar || PLS || — || align=right data-sort-value="0.99" | 990 m || 
|-id=030 bgcolor=#E9E9E9
| 118030 || 2325 T-2 || — || September 29, 1973 || Palomar || PLS || — || align=right | 2.3 km || 
|-id=031 bgcolor=#E9E9E9
| 118031 || 2330 T-2 || — || September 30, 1973 || Palomar || PLS || — || align=right | 2.8 km || 
|-id=032 bgcolor=#fefefe
| 118032 || 2410 T-2 || — || September 25, 1973 || Palomar || PLS || — || align=right | 1.6 km || 
|-id=033 bgcolor=#d6d6d6
| 118033 || 2904 T-2 || — || September 30, 1973 || Palomar || PLS || — || align=right | 5.6 km || 
|-id=034 bgcolor=#d6d6d6
| 118034 || 3015 T-2 || — || September 30, 1973 || Palomar || PLS || EOS || align=right | 3.5 km || 
|-id=035 bgcolor=#E9E9E9
| 118035 || 3031 T-2 || — || September 30, 1973 || Palomar || PLS || — || align=right | 3.2 km || 
|-id=036 bgcolor=#d6d6d6
| 118036 || 3038 T-2 || — || September 30, 1973 || Palomar || PLS || — || align=right | 7.1 km || 
|-id=037 bgcolor=#d6d6d6
| 118037 || 3041 T-2 || — || September 30, 1973 || Palomar || PLS || URS || align=right | 7.0 km || 
|-id=038 bgcolor=#fefefe
| 118038 || 3051 T-2 || — || September 30, 1973 || Palomar || PLS || — || align=right | 1.9 km || 
|-id=039 bgcolor=#fefefe
| 118039 || 3075 T-2 || — || September 30, 1973 || Palomar || PLS || — || align=right | 1.5 km || 
|-id=040 bgcolor=#d6d6d6
| 118040 || 3104 T-2 || — || September 30, 1973 || Palomar || PLS || KOR || align=right | 3.1 km || 
|-id=041 bgcolor=#fefefe
| 118041 || 3179 T-2 || — || September 30, 1973 || Palomar || PLS || — || align=right | 1.1 km || 
|-id=042 bgcolor=#d6d6d6
| 118042 || 3204 T-2 || — || September 30, 1973 || Palomar || PLS || — || align=right | 6.6 km || 
|-id=043 bgcolor=#fefefe
| 118043 || 3220 T-2 || — || September 30, 1973 || Palomar || PLS || — || align=right | 2.8 km || 
|-id=044 bgcolor=#d6d6d6
| 118044 || 3224 T-2 || — || September 30, 1973 || Palomar || PLS || — || align=right | 4.9 km || 
|-id=045 bgcolor=#d6d6d6
| 118045 || 3258 T-2 || — || September 30, 1973 || Palomar || PLS || — || align=right | 8.9 km || 
|-id=046 bgcolor=#d6d6d6
| 118046 || 3259 T-2 || — || September 30, 1973 || Palomar || PLS || — || align=right | 5.8 km || 
|-id=047 bgcolor=#fefefe
| 118047 || 3306 T-2 || — || September 30, 1973 || Palomar || PLS || — || align=right | 3.5 km || 
|-id=048 bgcolor=#fefefe
| 118048 || 3311 T-2 || — || September 30, 1973 || Palomar || PLS || — || align=right | 1.1 km || 
|-id=049 bgcolor=#fefefe
| 118049 || 4066 T-2 || — || September 29, 1973 || Palomar || PLS || — || align=right | 1.1 km || 
|-id=050 bgcolor=#d6d6d6
| 118050 || 4073 T-2 || — || September 29, 1973 || Palomar || PLS || — || align=right | 5.3 km || 
|-id=051 bgcolor=#fefefe
| 118051 || 4102 T-2 || — || September 29, 1973 || Palomar || PLS || V || align=right | 2.0 km || 
|-id=052 bgcolor=#d6d6d6
| 118052 || 4105 T-2 || — || September 29, 1973 || Palomar || PLS || — || align=right | 3.7 km || 
|-id=053 bgcolor=#d6d6d6
| 118053 || 4106 T-2 || — || September 29, 1973 || Palomar || PLS || — || align=right | 5.7 km || 
|-id=054 bgcolor=#fefefe
| 118054 || 4123 T-2 || — || September 29, 1973 || Palomar || PLS || — || align=right | 1.5 km || 
|-id=055 bgcolor=#d6d6d6
| 118055 || 4124 T-2 || — || September 29, 1973 || Palomar || PLS || — || align=right | 5.1 km || 
|-id=056 bgcolor=#fefefe
| 118056 || 4126 T-2 || — || September 29, 1973 || Palomar || PLS || MAS || align=right | 2.0 km || 
|-id=057 bgcolor=#d6d6d6
| 118057 || 4163 T-2 || — || September 29, 1973 || Palomar || PLS || — || align=right | 4.1 km || 
|-id=058 bgcolor=#fefefe
| 118058 || 4175 T-2 || — || September 29, 1973 || Palomar || PLS || — || align=right | 1.6 km || 
|-id=059 bgcolor=#d6d6d6
| 118059 || 4206 T-2 || — || September 29, 1973 || Palomar || PLS || EMA || align=right | 7.1 km || 
|-id=060 bgcolor=#fefefe
| 118060 || 4213 T-2 || — || September 29, 1973 || Palomar || PLS || MAS || align=right | 1.3 km || 
|-id=061 bgcolor=#fefefe
| 118061 || 4249 T-2 || — || September 29, 1973 || Palomar || PLS || — || align=right | 1.8 km || 
|-id=062 bgcolor=#d6d6d6
| 118062 || 4256 T-2 || — || September 29, 1973 || Palomar || PLS || EOS || align=right | 3.9 km || 
|-id=063 bgcolor=#fefefe
| 118063 || 4259 T-2 || — || September 29, 1973 || Palomar || PLS || — || align=right | 1.3 km || 
|-id=064 bgcolor=#E9E9E9
| 118064 || 4292 T-2 || — || September 29, 1973 || Palomar || PLS || — || align=right | 3.2 km || 
|-id=065 bgcolor=#fefefe
| 118065 || 4302 T-2 || — || September 29, 1973 || Palomar || PLS || MAS || align=right | 1.7 km || 
|-id=066 bgcolor=#fefefe
| 118066 || 4317 T-2 || — || September 29, 1973 || Palomar || PLS || NYS || align=right | 1.4 km || 
|-id=067 bgcolor=#E9E9E9
| 118067 || 4648 T-2 || — || September 30, 1973 || Palomar || PLS || — || align=right | 2.9 km || 
|-id=068 bgcolor=#E9E9E9
| 118068 || 5011 T-2 || — || September 25, 1973 || Palomar || PLS || — || align=right | 3.6 km || 
|-id=069 bgcolor=#fefefe
| 118069 || 5022 T-2 || — || September 25, 1973 || Palomar || PLS || KLI || align=right | 3.3 km || 
|-id=070 bgcolor=#fefefe
| 118070 || 5060 T-2 || — || September 25, 1973 || Palomar || PLS || V || align=right | 1.3 km || 
|-id=071 bgcolor=#E9E9E9
| 118071 || 5062 T-2 || — || September 25, 1973 || Palomar || PLS || — || align=right | 1.9 km || 
|-id=072 bgcolor=#E9E9E9
| 118072 || 5076 T-2 || — || September 25, 1973 || Palomar || PLS || — || align=right | 2.0 km || 
|-id=073 bgcolor=#fefefe
| 118073 || 5077 T-2 || — || September 25, 1973 || Palomar || PLS || V || align=right | 1.3 km || 
|-id=074 bgcolor=#E9E9E9
| 118074 || 5078 T-2 || — || September 25, 1973 || Palomar || PLS || — || align=right | 3.5 km || 
|-id=075 bgcolor=#d6d6d6
| 118075 || 5082 T-2 || — || September 25, 1973 || Palomar || PLS || — || align=right | 5.6 km || 
|-id=076 bgcolor=#d6d6d6
| 118076 || 5100 T-2 || — || September 25, 1973 || Palomar || PLS || EOS || align=right | 4.1 km || 
|-id=077 bgcolor=#d6d6d6
| 118077 || 5165 T-2 || — || September 25, 1973 || Palomar || PLS || — || align=right | 4.7 km || 
|-id=078 bgcolor=#E9E9E9
| 118078 || 5174 T-2 || — || September 25, 1973 || Palomar || PLS || — || align=right | 3.4 km || 
|-id=079 bgcolor=#d6d6d6
| 118079 || 5189 T-2 || — || September 25, 1973 || Palomar || PLS || — || align=right | 4.1 km || 
|-id=080 bgcolor=#d6d6d6
| 118080 || 5197 T-2 || — || September 25, 1973 || Palomar || PLS || EOS || align=right | 3.4 km || 
|-id=081 bgcolor=#d6d6d6
| 118081 || 5206 T-2 || — || September 25, 1973 || Palomar || PLS || — || align=right | 7.0 km || 
|-id=082 bgcolor=#fefefe
| 118082 || 5207 T-2 || — || September 25, 1973 || Palomar || PLS || V || align=right | 1.4 km || 
|-id=083 bgcolor=#d6d6d6
| 118083 || 5215 T-2 || — || September 25, 1973 || Palomar || PLS || — || align=right | 6.1 km || 
|-id=084 bgcolor=#d6d6d6
| 118084 || 5340 T-2 || — || September 25, 1973 || Palomar || PLS || EOS || align=right | 3.7 km || 
|-id=085 bgcolor=#d6d6d6
| 118085 || 1019 T-3 || — || October 17, 1977 || Palomar || PLS || — || align=right | 11 km || 
|-id=086 bgcolor=#fefefe
| 118086 || 1037 T-3 || — || October 17, 1977 || Palomar || PLS || V || align=right | 1.4 km || 
|-id=087 bgcolor=#d6d6d6
| 118087 || 1043 T-3 || — || October 17, 1977 || Palomar || PLS || — || align=right | 7.7 km || 
|-id=088 bgcolor=#E9E9E9
| 118088 || 1090 T-3 || — || October 17, 1977 || Palomar || PLS || EUN || align=right | 1.8 km || 
|-id=089 bgcolor=#E9E9E9
| 118089 || 1093 T-3 || — || October 17, 1977 || Palomar || PLS || — || align=right | 2.9 km || 
|-id=090 bgcolor=#E9E9E9
| 118090 || 1105 T-3 || — || October 17, 1977 || Palomar || PLS || — || align=right | 2.1 km || 
|-id=091 bgcolor=#fefefe
| 118091 || 1124 T-3 || — || October 17, 1977 || Palomar || PLS || — || align=right | 3.0 km || 
|-id=092 bgcolor=#fefefe
| 118092 || 1150 T-3 || — || October 17, 1977 || Palomar || PLS || — || align=right | 1.7 km || 
|-id=093 bgcolor=#d6d6d6
| 118093 || 1163 T-3 || — || October 17, 1977 || Palomar || PLS || — || align=right | 8.3 km || 
|-id=094 bgcolor=#d6d6d6
| 118094 || 1852 T-3 || — || October 17, 1977 || Palomar || PLS || ALA || align=right | 6.7 km || 
|-id=095 bgcolor=#E9E9E9
| 118095 || 2007 T-3 || — || October 16, 1977 || Palomar || PLS || — || align=right | 2.3 km || 
|-id=096 bgcolor=#fefefe
| 118096 || 2125 T-3 || — || October 16, 1977 || Palomar || PLS || V || align=right | 1.0 km || 
|-id=097 bgcolor=#d6d6d6
| 118097 || 2148 T-3 || — || October 16, 1977 || Palomar || PLS || — || align=right | 3.6 km || 
|-id=098 bgcolor=#E9E9E9
| 118098 || 2171 T-3 || — || October 16, 1977 || Palomar || PLS || — || align=right | 1.5 km || 
|-id=099 bgcolor=#fefefe
| 118099 || 2210 T-3 || — || October 16, 1977 || Palomar || PLS || — || align=right | 1.8 km || 
|-id=100 bgcolor=#E9E9E9
| 118100 || 2224 T-3 || — || October 16, 1977 || Palomar || PLS || — || align=right | 2.1 km || 
|}

118101–118200 

|-bgcolor=#fefefe
| 118101 || 2228 T-3 || — || October 16, 1977 || Palomar || PLS || V || align=right | 1.1 km || 
|-id=102 bgcolor=#fefefe
| 118102 Rinjani || 2254 T-3 ||  || October 16, 1977 || Palomar || PLS || H || align=right | 1.2 km || 
|-id=103 bgcolor=#d6d6d6
| 118103 || 2279 T-3 || — || October 16, 1977 || Palomar || PLS || — || align=right | 3.4 km || 
|-id=104 bgcolor=#E9E9E9
| 118104 || 2294 T-3 || — || October 16, 1977 || Palomar || PLS || — || align=right | 2.5 km || 
|-id=105 bgcolor=#E9E9E9
| 118105 || 2309 T-3 || — || October 16, 1977 || Palomar || PLS || — || align=right | 2.2 km || 
|-id=106 bgcolor=#d6d6d6
| 118106 || 2343 T-3 || — || October 16, 1977 || Palomar || PLS || KOR || align=right | 2.9 km || 
|-id=107 bgcolor=#E9E9E9
| 118107 || 2361 T-3 || — || October 16, 1977 || Palomar || PLS || MIT || align=right | 5.4 km || 
|-id=108 bgcolor=#FA8072
| 118108 || 2398 T-3 || — || October 16, 1977 || Palomar || PLS || — || align=right | 1.7 km || 
|-id=109 bgcolor=#d6d6d6
| 118109 || 2445 T-3 || — || October 16, 1977 || Palomar || PLS || URS || align=right | 8.2 km || 
|-id=110 bgcolor=#fefefe
| 118110 || 2493 T-3 || — || October 16, 1977 || Palomar || PLS || V || align=right | 1.3 km || 
|-id=111 bgcolor=#E9E9E9
| 118111 || 2633 T-3 || — || October 16, 1977 || Palomar || PLS || — || align=right | 1.8 km || 
|-id=112 bgcolor=#FA8072
| 118112 || 2665 T-3 || — || October 11, 1977 || Palomar || PLS || — || align=right | 1.1 km || 
|-id=113 bgcolor=#fefefe
| 118113 || 3091 T-3 || — || October 16, 1977 || Palomar || PLS || — || align=right | 1.3 km || 
|-id=114 bgcolor=#fefefe
| 118114 || 3117 T-3 || — || October 16, 1977 || Palomar || PLS || MAS || align=right | 1.1 km || 
|-id=115 bgcolor=#E9E9E9
| 118115 || 3118 T-3 || — || October 16, 1977 || Palomar || PLS || — || align=right | 1.7 km || 
|-id=116 bgcolor=#fefefe
| 118116 || 3161 T-3 || — || October 16, 1977 || Palomar || PLS || MAS || align=right | 1.9 km || 
|-id=117 bgcolor=#fefefe
| 118117 || 3168 T-3 || — || October 16, 1977 || Palomar || PLS || — || align=right | 1.6 km || 
|-id=118 bgcolor=#E9E9E9
| 118118 || 3169 T-3 || — || October 16, 1977 || Palomar || PLS || — || align=right | 1.2 km || 
|-id=119 bgcolor=#E9E9E9
| 118119 || 3177 T-3 || — || October 16, 1977 || Palomar || PLS || DOR || align=right | 3.9 km || 
|-id=120 bgcolor=#d6d6d6
| 118120 || 3181 T-3 || — || October 16, 1977 || Palomar || PLS || — || align=right | 6.7 km || 
|-id=121 bgcolor=#E9E9E9
| 118121 || 3211 T-3 || — || October 16, 1977 || Palomar || PLS || — || align=right | 2.4 km || 
|-id=122 bgcolor=#E9E9E9
| 118122 || 3228 T-3 || — || October 16, 1977 || Palomar || PLS || — || align=right | 2.4 km || 
|-id=123 bgcolor=#E9E9E9
| 118123 || 3238 T-3 || — || October 16, 1977 || Palomar || PLS || MAR || align=right | 2.6 km || 
|-id=124 bgcolor=#fefefe
| 118124 || 3253 T-3 || — || October 16, 1977 || Palomar || PLS || — || align=right | 1.1 km || 
|-id=125 bgcolor=#d6d6d6
| 118125 || 3278 T-3 || — || October 16, 1977 || Palomar || PLS || — || align=right | 6.0 km || 
|-id=126 bgcolor=#E9E9E9
| 118126 || 3344 T-3 || — || October 16, 1977 || Palomar || PLS || — || align=right | 2.4 km || 
|-id=127 bgcolor=#fefefe
| 118127 || 3399 T-3 || — || October 16, 1977 || Palomar || PLS || V || align=right | 1.1 km || 
|-id=128 bgcolor=#fefefe
| 118128 || 3457 T-3 || — || October 16, 1977 || Palomar || PLS || NYS || align=right | 1.1 km || 
|-id=129 bgcolor=#fefefe
| 118129 || 3459 T-3 || — || October 16, 1977 || Palomar || PLS || — || align=right | 1.1 km || 
|-id=130 bgcolor=#E9E9E9
| 118130 || 3469 T-3 || — || October 16, 1977 || Palomar || PLS || — || align=right | 3.9 km || 
|-id=131 bgcolor=#fefefe
| 118131 || 3501 T-3 || — || October 16, 1977 || Palomar || PLS || — || align=right | 1.6 km || 
|-id=132 bgcolor=#fefefe
| 118132 || 3505 T-3 || — || October 16, 1977 || Palomar || PLS || NYS || align=right | 1.4 km || 
|-id=133 bgcolor=#d6d6d6
| 118133 || 3523 T-3 || — || October 16, 1977 || Palomar || PLS || THM || align=right | 4.1 km || 
|-id=134 bgcolor=#fefefe
| 118134 || 3533 T-3 || — || October 16, 1977 || Palomar || PLS || MAS || align=right | 1.3 km || 
|-id=135 bgcolor=#fefefe
| 118135 || 3559 T-3 || — || October 16, 1977 || Palomar || PLS || MAS || align=right | 1.0 km || 
|-id=136 bgcolor=#E9E9E9
| 118136 || 3756 T-3 || — || October 16, 1977 || Palomar || PLS || — || align=right | 1.7 km || 
|-id=137 bgcolor=#E9E9E9
| 118137 || 3813 T-3 || — || October 16, 1977 || Palomar || PLS || — || align=right | 1.3 km || 
|-id=138 bgcolor=#d6d6d6
| 118138 || 4036 T-3 || — || October 16, 1977 || Palomar || PLS || HYG || align=right | 4.7 km || 
|-id=139 bgcolor=#d6d6d6
| 118139 || 4041 T-3 || — || October 16, 1977 || Palomar || PLS || — || align=right | 3.9 km || 
|-id=140 bgcolor=#E9E9E9
| 118140 || 4042 T-3 || — || October 16, 1977 || Palomar || PLS || — || align=right | 3.0 km || 
|-id=141 bgcolor=#E9E9E9
| 118141 || 4048 T-3 || — || October 16, 1977 || Palomar || PLS || — || align=right | 4.1 km || 
|-id=142 bgcolor=#E9E9E9
| 118142 || 4117 T-3 || — || October 16, 1977 || Palomar || PLS || AGN || align=right | 2.3 km || 
|-id=143 bgcolor=#d6d6d6
| 118143 || 4124 T-3 || — || October 16, 1977 || Palomar || PLS || KOR || align=right | 3.1 km || 
|-id=144 bgcolor=#fefefe
| 118144 || 4136 T-3 || — || October 16, 1977 || Palomar || PLS || — || align=right | 1.1 km || 
|-id=145 bgcolor=#fefefe
| 118145 || 4142 T-3 || — || October 16, 1977 || Palomar || PLS || V || align=right | 1.5 km || 
|-id=146 bgcolor=#fefefe
| 118146 || 4161 T-3 || — || October 16, 1977 || Palomar || PLS || — || align=right | 1.7 km || 
|-id=147 bgcolor=#fefefe
| 118147 || 4183 T-3 || — || October 16, 1977 || Palomar || PLS || — || align=right | 1.3 km || 
|-id=148 bgcolor=#E9E9E9
| 118148 || 4204 T-3 || — || October 16, 1977 || Palomar || PLS || — || align=right | 1.5 km || 
|-id=149 bgcolor=#E9E9E9
| 118149 || 4298 T-3 || — || October 16, 1977 || Palomar || PLS || — || align=right | 4.3 km || 
|-id=150 bgcolor=#fefefe
| 118150 || 4325 T-3 || — || October 16, 1977 || Palomar || PLS || — || align=right | 1.6 km || 
|-id=151 bgcolor=#FA8072
| 118151 || 4391 T-3 || — || October 16, 1977 || Palomar || PLS || — || align=right | 1.8 km || 
|-id=152 bgcolor=#d6d6d6
| 118152 || 5076 T-3 || — || October 16, 1977 || Palomar || PLS || — || align=right | 6.1 km || 
|-id=153 bgcolor=#fefefe
| 118153 || 5083 T-3 || — || October 16, 1977 || Palomar || PLS || — || align=right | 1.7 km || 
|-id=154 bgcolor=#d6d6d6
| 118154 || 5110 T-3 || — || October 16, 1977 || Palomar || PLS || — || align=right | 5.9 km || 
|-id=155 bgcolor=#E9E9E9
| 118155 || 5141 T-3 || — || October 16, 1977 || Palomar || PLS || GEF || align=right | 2.1 km || 
|-id=156 bgcolor=#E9E9E9
| 118156 || 5146 T-3 || — || October 16, 1977 || Palomar || PLS || HNS || align=right | 2.2 km || 
|-id=157 bgcolor=#E9E9E9
| 118157 || 5157 T-3 || — || October 16, 1977 || Palomar || PLS || — || align=right | 2.9 km || 
|-id=158 bgcolor=#d6d6d6
| 118158 || 5161 T-3 || — || October 16, 1977 || Palomar || PLS || — || align=right | 4.3 km || 
|-id=159 bgcolor=#fefefe
| 118159 || 5162 T-3 || — || October 16, 1977 || Palomar || PLS || SVE || align=right | 4.3 km || 
|-id=160 bgcolor=#E9E9E9
| 118160 || 5646 T-3 || — || October 16, 1977 || Palomar || PLS || — || align=right | 3.6 km || 
|-id=161 bgcolor=#E9E9E9
| 118161 || 5710 T-3 || — || October 16, 1977 || Palomar || PLS || — || align=right | 2.7 km || 
|-id=162 bgcolor=#FA8072
| 118162 || 1951 SX || — || September 29, 1951 || Palomar || A. G. Wilson || — || align=right | 1.4 km || 
|-id=163 bgcolor=#E9E9E9
| 118163 ||  || — || June 25, 1979 || Siding Spring || E. F. Helin, S. J. Bus || — || align=right | 3.5 km || 
|-id=164 bgcolor=#fefefe
| 118164 ||  || — || February 28, 1981 || Siding Spring || S. J. Bus || V || align=right | 1.3 km || 
|-id=165 bgcolor=#d6d6d6
| 118165 ||  || — || March 2, 1981 || Siding Spring || S. J. Bus || — || align=right | 5.5 km || 
|-id=166 bgcolor=#fefefe
| 118166 ||  || — || March 2, 1981 || Siding Spring || S. J. Bus || — || align=right | 1.6 km || 
|-id=167 bgcolor=#FA8072
| 118167 ||  || — || March 2, 1981 || Siding Spring || S. J. Bus || — || align=right | 1.0 km || 
|-id=168 bgcolor=#E9E9E9
| 118168 ||  || — || March 1, 1981 || Siding Spring || S. J. Bus || — || align=right | 3.0 km || 
|-id=169 bgcolor=#E9E9E9
| 118169 ||  || — || March 2, 1981 || Siding Spring || S. J. Bus || — || align=right | 2.4 km || 
|-id=170 bgcolor=#E9E9E9
| 118170 ||  || — || March 2, 1981 || Siding Spring || S. J. Bus || MAR || align=right | 2.9 km || 
|-id=171 bgcolor=#E9E9E9
| 118171 ||  || — || February 16, 1988 || La Silla || E. W. Elst || DOR || align=right | 4.7 km || 
|-id=172 bgcolor=#E9E9E9
| 118172 Vorgebirge ||  ||  || April 5, 1989 || La Silla || M. Geffert || — || align=right | 4.2 km || 
|-id=173 bgcolor=#d6d6d6
| 118173 Barmen ||  ||  || April 11, 1991 || Tautenburg Observatory || F. Börngen || — || align=right | 8.3 km || 
|-id=174 bgcolor=#FA8072
| 118174 ||  || — || September 12, 1991 || Palomar || H. E. Holt || — || align=right | 1.6 km || 
|-id=175 bgcolor=#fefefe
| 118175 ||  || — || October 6, 1991 || Palomar || A. Lowe || V || align=right data-sort-value="0.99" | 990 m || 
|-id=176 bgcolor=#fefefe
| 118176 ||  || — || January 26, 1992 || Kitt Peak || Spacewatch || — || align=right | 2.1 km || 
|-id=177 bgcolor=#d6d6d6
| 118177 ||  || — || March 2, 1992 || La Silla || UESAC || HIL3:2 || align=right | 9.9 km || 
|-id=178 bgcolor=#E9E9E9
| 118178 Rinckart ||  ||  || September 23, 1992 || Tautenburg Observatory || F. Börngen || — || align=right | 6.2 km || 
|-id=179 bgcolor=#fefefe
| 118179 ||  || — || March 17, 1993 || La Silla || UESAC || V || align=right | 1.5 km || 
|-id=180 bgcolor=#fefefe
| 118180 ||  || — || March 17, 1993 || La Silla || UESAC || — || align=right | 1.7 km || 
|-id=181 bgcolor=#E9E9E9
| 118181 ||  || — || March 17, 1993 || La Silla || UESAC || — || align=right | 4.0 km || 
|-id=182 bgcolor=#fefefe
| 118182 ||  || — || March 17, 1993 || La Silla || UESAC || — || align=right | 1.7 km || 
|-id=183 bgcolor=#fefefe
| 118183 ||  || — || March 21, 1993 || La Silla || UESAC || NYS || align=right | 1.1 km || 
|-id=184 bgcolor=#fefefe
| 118184 ||  || — || March 21, 1993 || La Silla || UESAC || NYS || align=right | 1.5 km || 
|-id=185 bgcolor=#fefefe
| 118185 ||  || — || March 21, 1993 || La Silla || UESAC || — || align=right | 1.4 km || 
|-id=186 bgcolor=#d6d6d6
| 118186 || 1993 XC || — || December 4, 1993 || Farra d'Isonzo || Farra d'Isonzo || 7:4 || align=right | 6.2 km || 
|-id=187 bgcolor=#E9E9E9
| 118187 ||  || — || December 16, 1993 || Kitt Peak || Spacewatch || — || align=right | 2.0 km || 
|-id=188 bgcolor=#d6d6d6
| 118188 ||  || — || April 6, 1994 || Kitt Peak || Spacewatch || — || align=right | 3.4 km || 
|-id=189 bgcolor=#fefefe
| 118189 ||  || — || August 10, 1994 || La Silla || E. W. Elst || NYS || align=right data-sort-value="0.96" | 960 m || 
|-id=190 bgcolor=#fefefe
| 118190 ||  || — || August 10, 1994 || La Silla || E. W. Elst || NYS || align=right | 2.6 km || 
|-id=191 bgcolor=#fefefe
| 118191 ||  || — || August 10, 1994 || La Silla || E. W. Elst || — || align=right | 1.6 km || 
|-id=192 bgcolor=#d6d6d6
| 118192 ||  || — || September 12, 1994 || Kitt Peak || Spacewatch || — || align=right | 3.3 km || 
|-id=193 bgcolor=#d6d6d6
| 118193 ||  || — || September 12, 1994 || Xinglong || SCAP || — || align=right | 2.8 km || 
|-id=194 bgcolor=#fefefe
| 118194 Sabinagarroni || 1994 SG ||  || September 30, 1994 || Farra d'Isonzo || Farra d'Isonzo || — || align=right | 1.5 km || 
|-id=195 bgcolor=#d6d6d6
| 118195 ||  || — || September 28, 1994 || Kitt Peak || Spacewatch || — || align=right | 5.5 km || 
|-id=196 bgcolor=#fefefe
| 118196 ||  || — || October 6, 1994 || Kitt Peak || Spacewatch || — || align=right | 1.2 km || 
|-id=197 bgcolor=#FA8072
| 118197 ||  || — || October 28, 1994 || Kitt Peak || Spacewatch || — || align=right | 1.8 km || 
|-id=198 bgcolor=#fefefe
| 118198 ||  || — || October 28, 1994 || Kitt Peak || Spacewatch || — || align=right | 1.5 km || 
|-id=199 bgcolor=#fefefe
| 118199 ||  || — || February 1, 1995 || Kitt Peak || Spacewatch || NYS || align=right | 1.2 km || 
|-id=200 bgcolor=#fefefe
| 118200 ||  || — || February 2, 1995 || Kitt Peak || Spacewatch || H || align=right | 1.4 km || 
|}

118201–118300 

|-bgcolor=#E9E9E9
| 118201 ||  || — || March 29, 1995 || Kitt Peak || Spacewatch || — || align=right | 2.3 km || 
|-id=202 bgcolor=#E9E9E9
| 118202 ||  || — || April 26, 1995 || Kitt Peak || Spacewatch || — || align=right | 1.6 km || 
|-id=203 bgcolor=#E9E9E9
| 118203 ||  || — || April 26, 1995 || Kitt Peak || Spacewatch || MIS || align=right | 4.9 km || 
|-id=204 bgcolor=#E9E9E9
| 118204 ||  || — || June 23, 1995 || Kitt Peak || Spacewatch || HNS || align=right | 1.6 km || 
|-id=205 bgcolor=#E9E9E9
| 118205 ||  || — || June 25, 1995 || Kitt Peak || Spacewatch || ADE || align=right | 5.3 km || 
|-id=206 bgcolor=#E9E9E9
| 118206 ||  || — || July 22, 1995 || Kitt Peak || Spacewatch || — || align=right | 3.1 km || 
|-id=207 bgcolor=#fefefe
| 118207 ||  || — || September 17, 1995 || Kitt Peak || Spacewatch || — || align=right data-sort-value="0.97" | 970 m || 
|-id=208 bgcolor=#d6d6d6
| 118208 ||  || — || October 2, 1995 || Kitt Peak || Spacewatch || KAR || align=right | 2.2 km || 
|-id=209 bgcolor=#d6d6d6
| 118209 ||  || — || October 19, 1995 || Kitt Peak || Spacewatch || KOR || align=right | 1.9 km || 
|-id=210 bgcolor=#fefefe
| 118210 ||  || — || October 23, 1995 || Kitt Peak || Spacewatch || — || align=right | 1.3 km || 
|-id=211 bgcolor=#fefefe
| 118211 ||  || — || November 15, 1995 || Kitt Peak || Spacewatch || FLO || align=right | 1.0 km || 
|-id=212 bgcolor=#E9E9E9
| 118212 ||  || — || December 14, 1995 || Kitt Peak || Spacewatch || HOF || align=right | 5.3 km || 
|-id=213 bgcolor=#d6d6d6
| 118213 ||  || — || December 22, 1995 || Kitt Peak || Spacewatch || — || align=right | 4.7 km || 
|-id=214 bgcolor=#d6d6d6
| 118214 Agnesediboemia ||  ||  || January 12, 1996 || Kleť || J. Tichá, M. Tichý || HYG || align=right | 6.5 km || 
|-id=215 bgcolor=#E9E9E9
| 118215 ||  || — || January 24, 1996 || Cloudcroft || W. Offutt || — || align=right | 4.2 km || 
|-id=216 bgcolor=#fefefe
| 118216 ||  || — || February 22, 1996 || Stroncone || A. Vagnozzi || — || align=right | 1.0 km || 
|-id=217 bgcolor=#fefefe
| 118217 ||  || — || March 11, 1996 || Kitt Peak || Spacewatch || NYS || align=right data-sort-value="0.97" | 970 m || 
|-id=218 bgcolor=#fefefe
| 118218 ||  || — || April 15, 1996 || La Silla || E. W. Elst || — || align=right | 2.0 km || 
|-id=219 bgcolor=#fefefe
| 118219 ||  || — || April 18, 1996 || La Silla || E. W. Elst || — || align=right | 4.4 km || 
|-id=220 bgcolor=#fefefe
| 118220 ||  || — || April 18, 1996 || La Silla || E. W. Elst || NYS || align=right | 1.3 km || 
|-id=221 bgcolor=#fefefe
| 118221 ||  || — || April 18, 1996 || La Silla || E. W. Elst || — || align=right | 2.6 km || 
|-id=222 bgcolor=#E9E9E9
| 118222 ||  || — || September 8, 1996 || Kitt Peak || Spacewatch || — || align=right | 3.1 km || 
|-id=223 bgcolor=#E9E9E9
| 118223 ||  || — || September 21, 1996 || Xinglong || SCAP || PAL || align=right | 4.0 km || 
|-id=224 bgcolor=#E9E9E9
| 118224 ||  || — || October 3, 1996 || Xinglong || SCAP || — || align=right | 3.4 km || 
|-id=225 bgcolor=#d6d6d6
| 118225 ||  || — || October 4, 1996 || Kitt Peak || Spacewatch || KAR || align=right | 1.9 km || 
|-id=226 bgcolor=#E9E9E9
| 118226 ||  || — || October 7, 1996 || Kitt Peak || Spacewatch || — || align=right | 4.2 km || 
|-id=227 bgcolor=#E9E9E9
| 118227 ||  || — || October 8, 1996 || La Silla || E. W. Elst || HNS || align=right | 2.8 km || 
|-id=228 bgcolor=#C2E0FF
| 118228 ||  || — || October 8, 1996 || Mauna Kea || J. Chen, D. C. Jewitt, C. Trujillo, J. X. Luu || plutino || align=right | 165 km || 
|-id=229 bgcolor=#E9E9E9
| 118229 ||  || — || November 10, 1996 || Kitt Peak || Spacewatch || — || align=right | 4.0 km || 
|-id=230 bgcolor=#E9E9E9
| 118230 Sado ||  ||  || November 30, 1996 || Chichibu || N. Satō || — || align=right | 3.8 km || 
|-id=231 bgcolor=#E9E9E9
| 118231 ||  || — || December 8, 1996 || Catalina Station || C. W. Hergenrother || — || align=right | 4.7 km || 
|-id=232 bgcolor=#E9E9E9
| 118232 ||  || — || January 9, 1997 || Oizumi || T. Kobayashi || DOR || align=right | 5.5 km || 
|-id=233 bgcolor=#fefefe
| 118233 Gfrancoferrini ||  ||  || January 30, 1997 || Cima Ekar || U. Munari, M. Tombelli || — || align=right | 1.8 km || 
|-id=234 bgcolor=#d6d6d6
| 118234 ||  || — || January 31, 1997 || Kitt Peak || Spacewatch || — || align=right | 4.3 km || 
|-id=235 bgcolor=#fefefe
| 118235 Federico ||  ||  || March 7, 1997 || Bologna || San Vittore Obs. || FLO || align=right | 1.7 km || 
|-id=236 bgcolor=#d6d6d6
| 118236 ||  || — || March 4, 1997 || Kitt Peak || Spacewatch || — || align=right | 5.1 km || 
|-id=237 bgcolor=#fefefe
| 118237 ||  || — || April 3, 1997 || Socorro || LINEAR || — || align=right | 1.5 km || 
|-id=238 bgcolor=#d6d6d6
| 118238 ||  || — || May 2, 1997 || Kitt Peak || Spacewatch || — || align=right | 7.3 km || 
|-id=239 bgcolor=#d6d6d6
| 118239 || 1997 KX || — || May 31, 1997 || Xinglong || SCAP || — || align=right | 7.7 km || 
|-id=240 bgcolor=#d6d6d6
| 118240 ||  || — || June 5, 1997 || Kitt Peak || Spacewatch || — || align=right | 5.1 km || 
|-id=241 bgcolor=#fefefe
| 118241 ||  || — || June 7, 1997 || La Silla || E. W. Elst || MAS || align=right | 1.2 km || 
|-id=242 bgcolor=#fefefe
| 118242 ||  || — || July 9, 1997 || Prescott || P. G. Comba || NYS || align=right | 1.7 km || 
|-id=243 bgcolor=#fefefe
| 118243 ||  || — || August 30, 1997 || Kleť || Z. Moravec || — || align=right | 1.3 km || 
|-id=244 bgcolor=#fefefe
| 118244 ||  || — || September 3, 1997 || Caussols || ODAS || NYS || align=right | 1.1 km || 
|-id=245 bgcolor=#fefefe
| 118245 ||  || — || September 23, 1997 || Xinglong || SCAP || NYS || align=right | 2.1 km || 
|-id=246 bgcolor=#fefefe
| 118246 ||  || — || September 27, 1997 || Caussols || ODAS || — || align=right | 2.1 km || 
|-id=247 bgcolor=#fefefe
| 118247 ||  || — || October 3, 1997 || Caussols || ODAS || NYS || align=right | 1.4 km || 
|-id=248 bgcolor=#fefefe
| 118248 ||  || — || October 2, 1997 || Kitt Peak || Spacewatch || — || align=right | 1.7 km || 
|-id=249 bgcolor=#E9E9E9
| 118249 ||  || — || November 23, 1997 || Kitt Peak || Spacewatch || — || align=right | 1.8 km || 
|-id=250 bgcolor=#E9E9E9
| 118250 ||  || — || January 19, 1998 || Uenohara || N. Kawasato || — || align=right | 2.9 km || 
|-id=251 bgcolor=#E9E9E9
| 118251 ||  || — || January 22, 1998 || Kitt Peak || Spacewatch || MIS || align=right | 5.4 km || 
|-id=252 bgcolor=#E9E9E9
| 118252 ||  || — || January 31, 1998 || Oizumi || T. Kobayashi || JUN || align=right | 2.5 km || 
|-id=253 bgcolor=#d6d6d6
| 118253 ||  || — || January 23, 1998 || Kitt Peak || Spacewatch || KOR || align=right | 1.8 km || 
|-id=254 bgcolor=#E9E9E9
| 118254 || 1998 CU || — || February 4, 1998 || Kleť || M. Tichý, Z. Moravec || JUN || align=right | 2.0 km || 
|-id=255 bgcolor=#E9E9E9
| 118255 ||  || — || February 6, 1998 || La Silla || E. W. Elst || — || align=right | 3.0 km || 
|-id=256 bgcolor=#E9E9E9
| 118256 ||  || — || February 23, 1998 || Kitt Peak || Spacewatch || — || align=right | 3.9 km || 
|-id=257 bgcolor=#E9E9E9
| 118257 ||  || — || March 20, 1998 || Socorro || LINEAR || — || align=right | 3.0 km || 
|-id=258 bgcolor=#E9E9E9
| 118258 ||  || — || March 20, 1998 || Socorro || LINEAR || — || align=right | 2.7 km || 
|-id=259 bgcolor=#d6d6d6
| 118259 ||  || — || March 20, 1998 || Socorro || LINEAR || — || align=right | 7.3 km || 
|-id=260 bgcolor=#E9E9E9
| 118260 ||  || — || March 20, 1998 || Socorro || LINEAR || — || align=right | 4.0 km || 
|-id=261 bgcolor=#E9E9E9
| 118261 ||  || — || March 24, 1998 || Socorro || LINEAR || — || align=right | 5.1 km || 
|-id=262 bgcolor=#E9E9E9
| 118262 ||  || — || March 24, 1998 || Socorro || LINEAR || — || align=right | 3.8 km || 
|-id=263 bgcolor=#E9E9E9
| 118263 ||  || — || March 24, 1998 || Socorro || LINEAR || — || align=right | 5.2 km || 
|-id=264 bgcolor=#d6d6d6
| 118264 ||  || — || March 31, 1998 || Socorro || LINEAR || — || align=right | 5.3 km || 
|-id=265 bgcolor=#E9E9E9
| 118265 ||  || — || March 29, 1998 || Socorro || LINEAR || MRX || align=right | 2.3 km || 
|-id=266 bgcolor=#d6d6d6
| 118266 ||  || — || April 18, 1998 || Socorro || LINEAR || — || align=right | 6.2 km || 
|-id=267 bgcolor=#d6d6d6
| 118267 ||  || — || April 21, 1998 || Socorro || LINEAR || — || align=right | 6.7 km || 
|-id=268 bgcolor=#d6d6d6
| 118268 ||  || — || April 21, 1998 || Socorro || LINEAR || — || align=right | 5.4 km || 
|-id=269 bgcolor=#E9E9E9
| 118269 ||  || — || April 21, 1998 || Socorro || LINEAR || — || align=right | 5.2 km || 
|-id=270 bgcolor=#E9E9E9
| 118270 ||  || — || April 19, 1998 || Socorro || LINEAR || DOR || align=right | 4.7 km || 
|-id=271 bgcolor=#fefefe
| 118271 ||  || — || April 25, 1998 || La Silla || E. W. Elst || — || align=right | 1.4 km || 
|-id=272 bgcolor=#d6d6d6
| 118272 ||  || — || May 22, 1998 || Kitt Peak || Spacewatch || EOS || align=right | 3.8 km || 
|-id=273 bgcolor=#FA8072
| 118273 ||  || — || July 26, 1998 || La Silla || E. W. Elst || — || align=right | 1.3 km || 
|-id=274 bgcolor=#fefefe
| 118274 ||  || — || August 17, 1998 || Socorro || LINEAR || — || align=right | 1.8 km || 
|-id=275 bgcolor=#fefefe
| 118275 ||  || — || August 17, 1998 || Socorro || LINEAR || — || align=right | 1.6 km || 
|-id=276 bgcolor=#fefefe
| 118276 ||  || — || August 17, 1998 || Socorro || LINEAR || — || align=right | 1.3 km || 
|-id=277 bgcolor=#fefefe
| 118277 ||  || — || August 25, 1998 || La Silla || E. W. Elst || — || align=right | 1.6 km || 
|-id=278 bgcolor=#fefefe
| 118278 ||  || — || September 14, 1998 || Socorro || LINEAR || — || align=right | 1.5 km || 
|-id=279 bgcolor=#fefefe
| 118279 ||  || — || September 14, 1998 || Socorro || LINEAR || — || align=right | 1.4 km || 
|-id=280 bgcolor=#fefefe
| 118280 ||  || — || September 14, 1998 || Socorro || LINEAR || FLO || align=right | 1.3 km || 
|-id=281 bgcolor=#fefefe
| 118281 ||  || — || September 14, 1998 || Socorro || LINEAR || — || align=right | 1.8 km || 
|-id=282 bgcolor=#fefefe
| 118282 ||  || — || September 14, 1998 || Socorro || LINEAR || — || align=right | 1.4 km || 
|-id=283 bgcolor=#fefefe
| 118283 ||  || — || September 14, 1998 || Socorro || LINEAR || FLO || align=right | 1.3 km || 
|-id=284 bgcolor=#fefefe
| 118284 ||  || — || September 14, 1998 || Socorro || LINEAR || V || align=right | 1.2 km || 
|-id=285 bgcolor=#fefefe
| 118285 ||  || — || September 14, 1998 || Socorro || LINEAR || — || align=right | 1.5 km || 
|-id=286 bgcolor=#fefefe
| 118286 ||  || — || September 14, 1998 || Socorro || LINEAR || FLO || align=right | 1.6 km || 
|-id=287 bgcolor=#fefefe
| 118287 ||  || — || September 14, 1998 || Socorro || LINEAR || — || align=right | 3.8 km || 
|-id=288 bgcolor=#fefefe
| 118288 ||  || — || September 20, 1998 || Prescott || P. G. Comba || — || align=right | 1.4 km || 
|-id=289 bgcolor=#fefefe
| 118289 ||  || — || September 19, 1998 || Uenohara || N. Kawasato || V || align=right | 1.3 km || 
|-id=290 bgcolor=#fefefe
| 118290 ||  || — || September 20, 1998 || Xinglong || SCAP || FLO || align=right | 1.4 km || 
|-id=291 bgcolor=#fefefe
| 118291 ||  || — || September 25, 1998 || Kitt Peak || Spacewatch || — || align=right | 1.6 km || 
|-id=292 bgcolor=#fefefe
| 118292 ||  || — || September 17, 1998 || Anderson Mesa || LONEOS || — || align=right | 3.9 km || 
|-id=293 bgcolor=#fefefe
| 118293 ||  || — || September 25, 1998 || Xinglong || SCAP || V || align=right | 1.3 km || 
|-id=294 bgcolor=#fefefe
| 118294 ||  || — || September 17, 1998 || Xinglong || SCAP || V || align=right | 1.2 km || 
|-id=295 bgcolor=#fefefe
| 118295 ||  || — || September 26, 1998 || Socorro || LINEAR || V || align=right | 1.2 km || 
|-id=296 bgcolor=#fefefe
| 118296 ||  || — || September 26, 1998 || Socorro || LINEAR || ERI || align=right | 3.7 km || 
|-id=297 bgcolor=#fefefe
| 118297 ||  || — || September 26, 1998 || Socorro || LINEAR || V || align=right | 1.3 km || 
|-id=298 bgcolor=#fefefe
| 118298 ||  || — || September 26, 1998 || Socorro || LINEAR || FLO || align=right | 1.2 km || 
|-id=299 bgcolor=#fefefe
| 118299 ||  || — || September 26, 1998 || Socorro || LINEAR || — || align=right | 1.5 km || 
|-id=300 bgcolor=#fefefe
| 118300 ||  || — || September 26, 1998 || Socorro || LINEAR || — || align=right | 1.8 km || 
|}

118301–118400 

|-bgcolor=#fefefe
| 118301 ||  || — || October 14, 1998 || Caussols || ODAS || — || align=right | 1.5 km || 
|-id=302 bgcolor=#fefefe
| 118302 ||  || — || October 14, 1998 || Anderson Mesa || LONEOS || — || align=right | 1.5 km || 
|-id=303 bgcolor=#fefefe
| 118303 || 1998 UG || — || October 17, 1998 || Catalina || CSS || — || align=right | 4.3 km || 
|-id=304 bgcolor=#fefefe
| 118304 ||  || — || October 28, 1998 || Višnjan Observatory || K. Korlević || — || align=right | 1.7 km || 
|-id=305 bgcolor=#fefefe
| 118305 ||  || — || October 18, 1998 || La Silla || E. W. Elst || V || align=right | 1.3 km || 
|-id=306 bgcolor=#fefefe
| 118306 ||  || — || October 28, 1998 || Socorro || LINEAR || NYS || align=right | 1.2 km || 
|-id=307 bgcolor=#FA8072
| 118307 ||  || — || November 10, 1998 || Socorro || LINEAR || — || align=right | 2.1 km || 
|-id=308 bgcolor=#fefefe
| 118308 ||  || — || November 10, 1998 || Socorro || LINEAR || fast? || align=right | 1.6 km || 
|-id=309 bgcolor=#fefefe
| 118309 ||  || — || November 10, 1998 || Socorro || LINEAR || FLO || align=right | 1.3 km || 
|-id=310 bgcolor=#fefefe
| 118310 ||  || — || November 15, 1998 || Catalina || CSS || PHO || align=right | 2.4 km || 
|-id=311 bgcolor=#fefefe
| 118311 ||  || — || November 10, 1998 || Socorro || LINEAR || — || align=right | 1.7 km || 
|-id=312 bgcolor=#fefefe
| 118312 ||  || — || November 11, 1998 || Socorro || LINEAR || — || align=right | 1.4 km || 
|-id=313 bgcolor=#fefefe
| 118313 ||  || — || November 17, 1998 || Caussols || ODAS || — || align=right | 1.3 km || 
|-id=314 bgcolor=#fefefe
| 118314 ||  || — || November 21, 1998 || Socorro || LINEAR || — || align=right | 1.5 km || 
|-id=315 bgcolor=#fefefe
| 118315 ||  || — || November 21, 1998 || Socorro || LINEAR || V || align=right | 1.2 km || 
|-id=316 bgcolor=#fefefe
| 118316 ||  || — || November 21, 1998 || Socorro || LINEAR || NYS || align=right | 1.2 km || 
|-id=317 bgcolor=#fefefe
| 118317 ||  || — || November 18, 1998 || Socorro || LINEAR || V || align=right | 1.2 km || 
|-id=318 bgcolor=#fefefe
| 118318 || 1998 XW || — || December 7, 1998 || Caussols || ODAS || NYS || align=right | 1.5 km || 
|-id=319 bgcolor=#fefefe
| 118319 ||  || — || December 15, 1998 || Caussols || ODAS || MAS || align=right | 2.5 km || 
|-id=320 bgcolor=#E9E9E9
| 118320 ||  || — || December 15, 1998 || Caussols || ODAS || — || align=right | 2.6 km || 
|-id=321 bgcolor=#fefefe
| 118321 ||  || — || December 15, 1998 || Višnjan Observatory || K. Korlević || V || align=right | 1.3 km || 
|-id=322 bgcolor=#fefefe
| 118322 ||  || — || December 14, 1998 || Socorro || LINEAR || — || align=right | 1.8 km || 
|-id=323 bgcolor=#fefefe
| 118323 ||  || — || December 14, 1998 || Socorro || LINEAR || — || align=right | 1.9 km || 
|-id=324 bgcolor=#fefefe
| 118324 ||  || — || December 15, 1998 || Socorro || LINEAR || — || align=right | 1.8 km || 
|-id=325 bgcolor=#fefefe
| 118325 ||  || — || December 14, 1998 || Socorro || LINEAR || — || align=right | 1.8 km || 
|-id=326 bgcolor=#fefefe
| 118326 ||  || — || December 25, 1998 || Kitt Peak || Spacewatch || MAS || align=right | 1.3 km || 
|-id=327 bgcolor=#fefefe
| 118327 ||  || — || December 26, 1998 || Kitt Peak || Spacewatch || NYS || align=right | 1.2 km || 
|-id=328 bgcolor=#fefefe
| 118328 ||  || — || December 26, 1998 || Kitt Peak || Spacewatch || — || align=right | 1.8 km || 
|-id=329 bgcolor=#fefefe
| 118329 ||  || — || December 16, 1998 || Socorro || LINEAR || — || align=right | 1.6 km || 
|-id=330 bgcolor=#fefefe
| 118330 || 1999 AP || — || January 4, 1999 || Farra d'Isonzo || Farra d'Isonzo || ERI || align=right | 3.5 km || 
|-id=331 bgcolor=#fefefe
| 118331 ||  || — || January 9, 1999 || Oizumi || T. Kobayashi || — || align=right | 2.2 km || 
|-id=332 bgcolor=#fefefe
| 118332 ||  || — || January 8, 1999 || Kitt Peak || Spacewatch || MAS || align=right | 1.7 km || 
|-id=333 bgcolor=#fefefe
| 118333 ||  || — || January 15, 1999 || Catalina || CSS || PHO || align=right | 2.6 km || 
|-id=334 bgcolor=#fefefe
| 118334 ||  || — || January 15, 1999 || Caussols || ODAS || — || align=right | 1.5 km || 
|-id=335 bgcolor=#fefefe
| 118335 ||  || — || January 19, 1999 || Catalina || CSS || — || align=right | 2.2 km || 
|-id=336 bgcolor=#fefefe
| 118336 ||  || — || January 20, 1999 || Farra d'Isonzo || Farra d'Isonzo || — || align=right | 1.8 km || 
|-id=337 bgcolor=#FA8072
| 118337 ||  || — || January 23, 1999 || Catalina || CSS || — || align=right | 3.3 km || 
|-id=338 bgcolor=#fefefe
| 118338 || 1999 CS || — || February 5, 1999 || Oizumi || T. Kobayashi || — || align=right | 2.1 km || 
|-id=339 bgcolor=#fefefe
| 118339 ||  || — || February 10, 1999 || Socorro || LINEAR || — || align=right | 2.7 km || 
|-id=340 bgcolor=#fefefe
| 118340 ||  || — || February 10, 1999 || Socorro || LINEAR || — || align=right | 1.6 km || 
|-id=341 bgcolor=#fefefe
| 118341 ||  || — || February 10, 1999 || Socorro || LINEAR || — || align=right | 2.3 km || 
|-id=342 bgcolor=#fefefe
| 118342 ||  || — || February 10, 1999 || Socorro || LINEAR || NYS || align=right | 1.3 km || 
|-id=343 bgcolor=#E9E9E9
| 118343 ||  || — || February 10, 1999 || Socorro || LINEAR || — || align=right | 2.0 km || 
|-id=344 bgcolor=#E9E9E9
| 118344 ||  || — || February 10, 1999 || Socorro || LINEAR || — || align=right | 1.9 km || 
|-id=345 bgcolor=#fefefe
| 118345 ||  || — || February 10, 1999 || Socorro || LINEAR || — || align=right | 1.9 km || 
|-id=346 bgcolor=#fefefe
| 118346 ||  || — || February 10, 1999 || Socorro || LINEAR || — || align=right | 1.8 km || 
|-id=347 bgcolor=#fefefe
| 118347 ||  || — || February 12, 1999 || Socorro || LINEAR || — || align=right | 2.0 km || 
|-id=348 bgcolor=#fefefe
| 118348 ||  || — || February 10, 1999 || Socorro || LINEAR || — || align=right | 1.4 km || 
|-id=349 bgcolor=#fefefe
| 118349 ||  || — || February 10, 1999 || Socorro || LINEAR || — || align=right | 1.7 km || 
|-id=350 bgcolor=#fefefe
| 118350 ||  || — || February 10, 1999 || Socorro || LINEAR || NYS || align=right | 3.9 km || 
|-id=351 bgcolor=#E9E9E9
| 118351 ||  || — || February 10, 1999 || Socorro || LINEAR || — || align=right | 3.2 km || 
|-id=352 bgcolor=#E9E9E9
| 118352 ||  || — || February 10, 1999 || Socorro || LINEAR || JUN || align=right | 2.1 km || 
|-id=353 bgcolor=#fefefe
| 118353 ||  || — || February 12, 1999 || Socorro || LINEAR || — || align=right | 2.0 km || 
|-id=354 bgcolor=#E9E9E9
| 118354 ||  || — || February 13, 1999 || Kitt Peak || Spacewatch || — || align=right | 2.3 km || 
|-id=355 bgcolor=#fefefe
| 118355 ||  || — || February 14, 1999 || Anderson Mesa || LONEOS || — || align=right | 3.5 km || 
|-id=356 bgcolor=#E9E9E9
| 118356 ||  || — || March 12, 1999 || Bergisch Gladbach || W. Bickel || — || align=right | 6.2 km || 
|-id=357 bgcolor=#fefefe
| 118357 ||  || — || March 15, 1999 || Kitt Peak || Spacewatch || — || align=right | 1.7 km || 
|-id=358 bgcolor=#fefefe
| 118358 ||  || — || March 16, 1999 || Kitt Peak || Spacewatch || — || align=right | 1.3 km || 
|-id=359 bgcolor=#fefefe
| 118359 ||  || — || March 16, 1999 || Kitt Peak || Spacewatch || EUT || align=right data-sort-value="0.90" | 900 m || 
|-id=360 bgcolor=#E9E9E9
| 118360 ||  || — || March 17, 1999 || Kitt Peak || Spacewatch || — || align=right | 2.5 km || 
|-id=361 bgcolor=#fefefe
| 118361 ||  || — || March 17, 1999 || Kitt Peak || Spacewatch || — || align=right | 1.5 km || 
|-id=362 bgcolor=#E9E9E9
| 118362 ||  || — || March 23, 1999 || Kitt Peak || Spacewatch || — || align=right | 2.3 km || 
|-id=363 bgcolor=#E9E9E9
| 118363 ||  || — || March 20, 1999 || Socorro || LINEAR || — || align=right | 1.9 km || 
|-id=364 bgcolor=#fefefe
| 118364 ||  || — || March 20, 1999 || Socorro || LINEAR || NYS || align=right | 1.6 km || 
|-id=365 bgcolor=#E9E9E9
| 118365 ||  || — || March 20, 1999 || Socorro || LINEAR || — || align=right | 2.9 km || 
|-id=366 bgcolor=#E9E9E9
| 118366 || 1999 GK || — || April 5, 1999 || Modra || J. Tóth, D. Kalmančok || EUN || align=right | 2.3 km || 
|-id=367 bgcolor=#E9E9E9
| 118367 ||  || — || April 12, 1999 || Woomera || F. B. Zoltowski || — || align=right | 2.1 km || 
|-id=368 bgcolor=#E9E9E9
| 118368 ||  || — || April 11, 1999 || Kitt Peak || Spacewatch || — || align=right | 2.5 km || 
|-id=369 bgcolor=#fefefe
| 118369 ||  || — || April 11, 1999 || Kitt Peak || Spacewatch || — || align=right | 1.4 km || 
|-id=370 bgcolor=#E9E9E9
| 118370 ||  || — || April 14, 1999 || Kitt Peak || Spacewatch || — || align=right | 1.6 km || 
|-id=371 bgcolor=#E9E9E9
| 118371 ||  || — || April 12, 1999 || Socorro || LINEAR || JUN || align=right | 1.6 km || 
|-id=372 bgcolor=#E9E9E9
| 118372 ||  || — || April 12, 1999 || Socorro || LINEAR || — || align=right | 2.2 km || 
|-id=373 bgcolor=#E9E9E9
| 118373 ||  || — || April 12, 1999 || Socorro || LINEAR || — || align=right | 1.7 km || 
|-id=374 bgcolor=#E9E9E9
| 118374 ||  || — || April 7, 1999 || Kitt Peak || Spacewatch || — || align=right | 1.3 km || 
|-id=375 bgcolor=#E9E9E9
| 118375 ||  || — || April 16, 1999 || Kitt Peak || Spacewatch || — || align=right | 2.9 km || 
|-id=376 bgcolor=#E9E9E9
| 118376 ||  || — || April 16, 1999 || Kitt Peak || Spacewatch || — || align=right | 2.1 km || 
|-id=377 bgcolor=#E9E9E9
| 118377 ||  || — || April 19, 1999 || Kitt Peak || Spacewatch || — || align=right | 1.8 km || 
|-id=378 bgcolor=#C2E0FF
| 118378 ||  || — || April 17, 1999 || Kitt Peak || Kitt Peak Obs. || res4:7critical || align=right | 134 km || 
|-id=379 bgcolor=#C2E0FF
| 118379 ||  || — || April 18, 1999 || Kitt Peak || Kitt Peak Obs. || other TNOcritical || align=right | 134 km || 
|-id=380 bgcolor=#fefefe
| 118380 ||  || — || May 10, 1999 || Socorro || LINEAR || H || align=right data-sort-value="0.99" | 990 m || 
|-id=381 bgcolor=#fefefe
| 118381 ||  || — || May 12, 1999 || Socorro || LINEAR || H || align=right | 1.0 km || 
|-id=382 bgcolor=#fefefe
| 118382 ||  || — || May 12, 1999 || Socorro || LINEAR || H || align=right | 1.6 km || 
|-id=383 bgcolor=#E9E9E9
| 118383 ||  || — || May 8, 1999 || Catalina || CSS || EUN || align=right | 2.8 km || 
|-id=384 bgcolor=#fefefe
| 118384 ||  || — || May 12, 1999 || Socorro || LINEAR || — || align=right | 2.3 km || 
|-id=385 bgcolor=#E9E9E9
| 118385 ||  || — || May 12, 1999 || Socorro || LINEAR || — || align=right | 6.5 km || 
|-id=386 bgcolor=#fefefe
| 118386 ||  || — || May 13, 1999 || Socorro || LINEAR || H || align=right | 1.4 km || 
|-id=387 bgcolor=#E9E9E9
| 118387 ||  || — || May 12, 1999 || Socorro || LINEAR || BRU || align=right | 7.6 km || 
|-id=388 bgcolor=#fefefe
| 118388 ||  || — || May 10, 1999 || Socorro || LINEAR || NYS || align=right | 1.7 km || 
|-id=389 bgcolor=#d6d6d6
| 118389 ||  || — || May 10, 1999 || Socorro || LINEAR || — || align=right | 5.5 km || 
|-id=390 bgcolor=#E9E9E9
| 118390 ||  || — || May 10, 1999 || Socorro || LINEAR || — || align=right | 5.7 km || 
|-id=391 bgcolor=#E9E9E9
| 118391 ||  || — || May 13, 1999 || Socorro || LINEAR || — || align=right | 4.1 km || 
|-id=392 bgcolor=#E9E9E9
| 118392 ||  || — || May 10, 1999 || Socorro || LINEAR || — || align=right | 3.5 km || 
|-id=393 bgcolor=#E9E9E9
| 118393 ||  || — || May 17, 1999 || Kitt Peak || Spacewatch || — || align=right | 4.0 km || 
|-id=394 bgcolor=#d6d6d6
| 118394 ||  || — || July 13, 1999 || Socorro || LINEAR || — || align=right | 6.7 km || 
|-id=395 bgcolor=#d6d6d6
| 118395 ||  || — || July 14, 1999 || Socorro || LINEAR || — || align=right | 7.6 km || 
|-id=396 bgcolor=#fefefe
| 118396 ||  || — || September 8, 1999 || Socorro || LINEAR || H || align=right | 1.4 km || 
|-id=397 bgcolor=#d6d6d6
| 118397 ||  || — || September 8, 1999 || Uccle || T. Pauwels || — || align=right | 5.5 km || 
|-id=398 bgcolor=#d6d6d6
| 118398 ||  || — || September 7, 1999 || Socorro || LINEAR || — || align=right | 6.5 km || 
|-id=399 bgcolor=#d6d6d6
| 118399 ||  || — || September 7, 1999 || Socorro || LINEAR || ALA || align=right | 6.9 km || 
|-id=400 bgcolor=#d6d6d6
| 118400 ||  || — || September 7, 1999 || Socorro || LINEAR || — || align=right | 6.6 km || 
|}

118401–118500 

|-bgcolor=#d6d6d6
| 118401 LINEAR ||  ||  || September 7, 1999 || Socorro || LINEAR || THM || align=right | 3.5 km || 
|-id=402 bgcolor=#d6d6d6
| 118402 ||  || — || September 7, 1999 || Socorro || LINEAR || HYG || align=right | 3.8 km || 
|-id=403 bgcolor=#d6d6d6
| 118403 ||  || — || September 7, 1999 || Socorro || LINEAR || — || align=right | 6.0 km || 
|-id=404 bgcolor=#d6d6d6
| 118404 ||  || — || September 7, 1999 || Socorro || LINEAR || EOS || align=right | 4.2 km || 
|-id=405 bgcolor=#d6d6d6
| 118405 ||  || — || September 8, 1999 || Socorro || LINEAR || — || align=right | 3.6 km || 
|-id=406 bgcolor=#d6d6d6
| 118406 ||  || — || September 9, 1999 || Socorro || LINEAR || — || align=right | 5.5 km || 
|-id=407 bgcolor=#d6d6d6
| 118407 ||  || — || September 8, 1999 || Socorro || LINEAR || — || align=right | 6.5 km || 
|-id=408 bgcolor=#d6d6d6
| 118408 ||  || — || September 5, 1999 || Catalina || CSS || — || align=right | 4.4 km || 
|-id=409 bgcolor=#d6d6d6
| 118409 ||  || — || September 8, 1999 || Catalina || CSS || ALA || align=right | 7.2 km || 
|-id=410 bgcolor=#d6d6d6
| 118410 ||  || — || September 8, 1999 || Catalina || CSS || — || align=right | 7.1 km || 
|-id=411 bgcolor=#fefefe
| 118411 ||  || — || September 6, 1999 || Catalina || CSS || H || align=right | 1.4 km || 
|-id=412 bgcolor=#d6d6d6
| 118412 ||  || — || September 8, 1999 || Kitt Peak || Spacewatch || — || align=right | 8.2 km || 
|-id=413 bgcolor=#d6d6d6
| 118413 ||  || — || September 19, 1999 || Ondřejov || L. Kotková || MEL || align=right | 5.3 km || 
|-id=414 bgcolor=#d6d6d6
| 118414 ||  || — || September 30, 1999 || Catalina || CSS || — || align=right | 6.5 km || 
|-id=415 bgcolor=#d6d6d6
| 118415 ||  || — || September 30, 1999 || Socorro || LINEAR || LIX || align=right | 8.7 km || 
|-id=416 bgcolor=#d6d6d6
| 118416 ||  || — || October 7, 1999 || Višnjan Observatory || K. Korlević, M. Jurić || — || align=right | 6.6 km || 
|-id=417 bgcolor=#d6d6d6
| 118417 ||  || — || October 10, 1999 || Fountain Hills || C. W. Juels || — || align=right | 3.9 km || 
|-id=418 bgcolor=#d6d6d6
| 118418 Yangmei ||  ||  || October 14, 1999 || Xinglong || SCAP || VER || align=right | 5.5 km || 
|-id=419 bgcolor=#d6d6d6
| 118419 ||  || — || October 6, 1999 || Kitt Peak || Spacewatch || HYG || align=right | 5.3 km || 
|-id=420 bgcolor=#d6d6d6
| 118420 ||  || — || October 7, 1999 || Kitt Peak || Spacewatch || THM || align=right | 5.7 km || 
|-id=421 bgcolor=#d6d6d6
| 118421 ||  || — || October 8, 1999 || Kitt Peak || Spacewatch || — || align=right | 4.3 km || 
|-id=422 bgcolor=#d6d6d6
| 118422 ||  || — || October 9, 1999 || Kitt Peak || Spacewatch || THM || align=right | 4.1 km || 
|-id=423 bgcolor=#d6d6d6
| 118423 ||  || — || October 13, 1999 || Kitt Peak || Spacewatch || EUP || align=right | 8.0 km || 
|-id=424 bgcolor=#d6d6d6
| 118424 ||  || — || October 4, 1999 || Socorro || LINEAR || HYG || align=right | 6.1 km || 
|-id=425 bgcolor=#fefefe
| 118425 ||  || — || October 4, 1999 || Socorro || LINEAR || — || align=right | 1.2 km || 
|-id=426 bgcolor=#d6d6d6
| 118426 ||  || — || October 6, 1999 || Socorro || LINEAR || HYG || align=right | 4.7 km || 
|-id=427 bgcolor=#E9E9E9
| 118427 ||  || — || October 7, 1999 || Socorro || LINEAR || — || align=right | 5.2 km || 
|-id=428 bgcolor=#d6d6d6
| 118428 ||  || — || October 9, 1999 || Socorro || LINEAR || ARM || align=right | 6.4 km || 
|-id=429 bgcolor=#d6d6d6
| 118429 ||  || — || October 9, 1999 || Socorro || LINEAR || — || align=right | 5.9 km || 
|-id=430 bgcolor=#d6d6d6
| 118430 ||  || — || October 10, 1999 || Socorro || LINEAR || — || align=right | 4.4 km || 
|-id=431 bgcolor=#d6d6d6
| 118431 ||  || — || October 12, 1999 || Socorro || LINEAR || 7:4 || align=right | 8.8 km || 
|-id=432 bgcolor=#d6d6d6
| 118432 ||  || — || October 15, 1999 || Socorro || LINEAR || — || align=right | 5.7 km || 
|-id=433 bgcolor=#d6d6d6
| 118433 ||  || — || October 3, 1999 || Catalina || CSS || HYG || align=right | 5.9 km || 
|-id=434 bgcolor=#d6d6d6
| 118434 ||  || — || October 5, 1999 || Socorro || LINEAR || MEL || align=right | 6.1 km || 
|-id=435 bgcolor=#d6d6d6
| 118435 ||  || — || October 5, 1999 || Socorro || LINEAR || — || align=right | 9.9 km || 
|-id=436 bgcolor=#d6d6d6
| 118436 ||  || — || October 6, 1999 || Socorro || LINEAR || — || align=right | 5.6 km || 
|-id=437 bgcolor=#d6d6d6
| 118437 ||  || — || October 9, 1999 || Socorro || LINEAR || — || align=right | 6.5 km || 
|-id=438 bgcolor=#d6d6d6
| 118438 ||  || — || October 29, 1999 || Kitt Peak || Spacewatch || EOS || align=right | 3.7 km || 
|-id=439 bgcolor=#d6d6d6
| 118439 ||  || — || October 31, 1999 || Kitt Peak || Spacewatch || THM || align=right | 3.1 km || 
|-id=440 bgcolor=#d6d6d6
| 118440 ||  || — || October 16, 1999 || Kitt Peak || Spacewatch || THM || align=right | 3.5 km || 
|-id=441 bgcolor=#d6d6d6
| 118441 ||  || — || October 31, 1999 || Kitt Peak || Spacewatch || LIX || align=right | 8.3 km || 
|-id=442 bgcolor=#d6d6d6
| 118442 ||  || — || October 19, 1999 || Kitt Peak || Spacewatch || — || align=right | 4.2 km || 
|-id=443 bgcolor=#d6d6d6
| 118443 ||  || — || October 28, 1999 || Catalina || CSS || — || align=right | 3.6 km || 
|-id=444 bgcolor=#d6d6d6
| 118444 ||  || — || November 11, 1999 || Fountain Hills || C. W. Juels || TIR || align=right | 4.9 km || 
|-id=445 bgcolor=#fefefe
| 118445 ||  || — || November 3, 1999 || Socorro || LINEAR || — || align=right | 1.2 km || 
|-id=446 bgcolor=#d6d6d6
| 118446 ||  || — || November 4, 1999 || Socorro || LINEAR || — || align=right | 6.4 km || 
|-id=447 bgcolor=#d6d6d6
| 118447 ||  || — || November 5, 1999 || Socorro || LINEAR || — || align=right | 3.9 km || 
|-id=448 bgcolor=#d6d6d6
| 118448 ||  || — || November 9, 1999 || Socorro || LINEAR || HYG || align=right | 4.7 km || 
|-id=449 bgcolor=#d6d6d6
| 118449 ||  || — || November 9, 1999 || Socorro || LINEAR || — || align=right | 6.9 km || 
|-id=450 bgcolor=#d6d6d6
| 118450 ||  || — || November 5, 1999 || Kitt Peak || Spacewatch || — || align=right | 3.8 km || 
|-id=451 bgcolor=#d6d6d6
| 118451 ||  || — || November 9, 1999 || Socorro || LINEAR || — || align=right | 4.8 km || 
|-id=452 bgcolor=#d6d6d6
| 118452 ||  || — || November 9, 1999 || Kitt Peak || Spacewatch || LIX || align=right | 8.1 km || 
|-id=453 bgcolor=#d6d6d6
| 118453 ||  || — || November 14, 1999 || Socorro || LINEAR || — || align=right | 5.3 km || 
|-id=454 bgcolor=#fefefe
| 118454 ||  || — || November 14, 1999 || Socorro || LINEAR || — || align=right | 1.5 km || 
|-id=455 bgcolor=#d6d6d6
| 118455 ||  || — || November 12, 1999 || Socorro || LINEAR || THM || align=right | 6.0 km || 
|-id=456 bgcolor=#d6d6d6
| 118456 ||  || — || November 10, 1999 || Anderson Mesa || LONEOS || ALA || align=right | 8.2 km || 
|-id=457 bgcolor=#d6d6d6
| 118457 ||  || — || November 28, 1999 || Višnjan Observatory || K. Korlević || — || align=right | 6.0 km || 
|-id=458 bgcolor=#fefefe
| 118458 ||  || — || November 28, 1999 || Kitt Peak || Spacewatch || — || align=right | 1.2 km || 
|-id=459 bgcolor=#fefefe
| 118459 ||  || — || December 4, 1999 || Catalina || CSS || — || align=right | 1.1 km || 
|-id=460 bgcolor=#d6d6d6
| 118460 ||  || — || December 4, 1999 || Catalina || CSS || — || align=right | 8.4 km || 
|-id=461 bgcolor=#d6d6d6
| 118461 ||  || — || December 5, 1999 || Catalina || CSS || — || align=right | 5.8 km || 
|-id=462 bgcolor=#d6d6d6
| 118462 ||  || — || December 6, 1999 || Socorro || LINEAR || — || align=right | 9.6 km || 
|-id=463 bgcolor=#d6d6d6
| 118463 ||  || — || December 7, 1999 || Socorro || LINEAR || — || align=right | 7.1 km || 
|-id=464 bgcolor=#d6d6d6
| 118464 ||  || — || December 7, 1999 || Socorro || LINEAR || HYG || align=right | 6.1 km || 
|-id=465 bgcolor=#d6d6d6
| 118465 ||  || — || December 7, 1999 || Socorro || LINEAR || — || align=right | 5.3 km || 
|-id=466 bgcolor=#d6d6d6
| 118466 ||  || — || December 4, 1999 || Catalina || CSS || — || align=right | 8.9 km || 
|-id=467 bgcolor=#d6d6d6
| 118467 ||  || — || December 7, 1999 || Catalina || CSS || — || align=right | 8.5 km || 
|-id=468 bgcolor=#d6d6d6
| 118468 ||  || — || December 13, 1999 || Kitt Peak || Spacewatch || — || align=right | 6.2 km || 
|-id=469 bgcolor=#fefefe
| 118469 ||  || — || December 15, 1999 || Kitt Peak || Spacewatch || — || align=right | 1.4 km || 
|-id=470 bgcolor=#fefefe
| 118470 ||  || — || January 3, 2000 || Socorro || LINEAR || PHO || align=right | 3.2 km || 
|-id=471 bgcolor=#d6d6d6
| 118471 ||  || — || January 3, 2000 || Socorro || LINEAR || TIR || align=right | 7.4 km || 
|-id=472 bgcolor=#fefefe
| 118472 ||  || — || January 3, 2000 || Socorro || LINEAR || — || align=right | 1.4 km || 
|-id=473 bgcolor=#fefefe
| 118473 ||  || — || January 3, 2000 || Socorro || LINEAR || — || align=right | 2.0 km || 
|-id=474 bgcolor=#d6d6d6
| 118474 ||  || — || January 3, 2000 || Socorro || LINEAR || 7:4 || align=right | 10 km || 
|-id=475 bgcolor=#fefefe
| 118475 ||  || — || January 5, 2000 || Socorro || LINEAR || — || align=right | 1.8 km || 
|-id=476 bgcolor=#d6d6d6
| 118476 ||  || — || January 5, 2000 || Socorro || LINEAR || — || align=right | 6.4 km || 
|-id=477 bgcolor=#fefefe
| 118477 ||  || — || January 12, 2000 || Prescott || P. G. Comba || — || align=right | 1.7 km || 
|-id=478 bgcolor=#fefefe
| 118478 ||  || — || January 5, 2000 || Kitt Peak || Spacewatch || — || align=right data-sort-value="0.89" | 890 m || 
|-id=479 bgcolor=#fefefe
| 118479 ||  || — || January 6, 2000 || Socorro || LINEAR || — || align=right | 1.4 km || 
|-id=480 bgcolor=#fefefe
| 118480 ||  || — || January 26, 2000 || Kitt Peak || Spacewatch || — || align=right | 2.1 km || 
|-id=481 bgcolor=#fefefe
| 118481 ||  || — || January 28, 2000 || Kitt Peak || Spacewatch || — || align=right | 1.7 km || 
|-id=482 bgcolor=#fefefe
| 118482 ||  || — || January 30, 2000 || Catalina || CSS || — || align=right | 1.6 km || 
|-id=483 bgcolor=#fefefe
| 118483 ||  || — || February 2, 2000 || Socorro || LINEAR || — || align=right | 1.7 km || 
|-id=484 bgcolor=#fefefe
| 118484 ||  || — || February 2, 2000 || Socorro || LINEAR || FLO || align=right | 1.1 km || 
|-id=485 bgcolor=#fefefe
| 118485 ||  || — || February 2, 2000 || Socorro || LINEAR || — || align=right | 2.0 km || 
|-id=486 bgcolor=#fefefe
| 118486 ||  || — || February 2, 2000 || Socorro || LINEAR || — || align=right | 1.5 km || 
|-id=487 bgcolor=#fefefe
| 118487 ||  || — || February 2, 2000 || Socorro || LINEAR || — || align=right | 1.6 km || 
|-id=488 bgcolor=#fefefe
| 118488 ||  || — || February 3, 2000 || Socorro || LINEAR || — || align=right | 2.2 km || 
|-id=489 bgcolor=#fefefe
| 118489 ||  || — || February 1, 2000 || Catalina || CSS || NYS || align=right | 1.7 km || 
|-id=490 bgcolor=#fefefe
| 118490 ||  || — || February 2, 2000 || Socorro || LINEAR || — || align=right | 1.8 km || 
|-id=491 bgcolor=#fefefe
| 118491 ||  || — || February 4, 2000 || Socorro || LINEAR || — || align=right | 2.1 km || 
|-id=492 bgcolor=#fefefe
| 118492 ||  || — || February 7, 2000 || Kitt Peak || Spacewatch || — || align=right | 1.7 km || 
|-id=493 bgcolor=#fefefe
| 118493 ||  || — || February 27, 2000 || Višnjan Observatory || K. Korlević, M. Jurić || — || align=right | 1.6 km || 
|-id=494 bgcolor=#fefefe
| 118494 ||  || — || February 29, 2000 || Socorro || LINEAR || V || align=right | 1.5 km || 
|-id=495 bgcolor=#fefefe
| 118495 ||  || — || February 26, 2000 || Kitt Peak || Spacewatch || FLO || align=right | 1.1 km || 
|-id=496 bgcolor=#fefefe
| 118496 ||  || — || February 29, 2000 || Socorro || LINEAR || NYS || align=right | 1.1 km || 
|-id=497 bgcolor=#fefefe
| 118497 ||  || — || February 29, 2000 || Socorro || LINEAR || — || align=right | 1.5 km || 
|-id=498 bgcolor=#fefefe
| 118498 ||  || — || February 29, 2000 || Socorro || LINEAR || — || align=right | 2.9 km || 
|-id=499 bgcolor=#fefefe
| 118499 ||  || — || February 29, 2000 || Socorro || LINEAR || MAS || align=right | 1.2 km || 
|-id=500 bgcolor=#fefefe
| 118500 ||  || — || February 29, 2000 || Socorro || LINEAR || — || align=right | 1.5 km || 
|}

118501–118600 

|-bgcolor=#fefefe
| 118501 ||  || — || February 29, 2000 || Socorro || LINEAR || — || align=right | 1.7 km || 
|-id=502 bgcolor=#fefefe
| 118502 ||  || — || February 29, 2000 || Socorro || LINEAR || V || align=right | 1.3 km || 
|-id=503 bgcolor=#fefefe
| 118503 ||  || — || February 29, 2000 || Socorro || LINEAR || — || align=right | 3.2 km || 
|-id=504 bgcolor=#fefefe
| 118504 ||  || — || February 29, 2000 || Socorro || LINEAR || V || align=right | 1.0 km || 
|-id=505 bgcolor=#fefefe
| 118505 ||  || — || February 29, 2000 || Socorro || LINEAR || — || align=right | 2.0 km || 
|-id=506 bgcolor=#fefefe
| 118506 ||  || — || February 28, 2000 || Socorro || LINEAR || FLO || align=right | 1.2 km || 
|-id=507 bgcolor=#fefefe
| 118507 ||  || — || February 28, 2000 || Socorro || LINEAR || FLO || align=right | 1.5 km || 
|-id=508 bgcolor=#fefefe
| 118508 ||  || — || February 28, 2000 || Socorro || LINEAR || V || align=right | 1.2 km || 
|-id=509 bgcolor=#fefefe
| 118509 ||  || — || February 29, 2000 || Socorro || LINEAR || V || align=right | 1.4 km || 
|-id=510 bgcolor=#fefefe
| 118510 ||  || — || February 27, 2000 || Kitt Peak || Spacewatch || FLO || align=right | 1.3 km || 
|-id=511 bgcolor=#fefefe
| 118511 ||  || — || February 28, 2000 || Socorro || LINEAR || — || align=right | 1.3 km || 
|-id=512 bgcolor=#fefefe
| 118512 ||  || — || February 28, 2000 || Socorro || LINEAR || FLO || align=right | 1.2 km || 
|-id=513 bgcolor=#fefefe
| 118513 ||  || — || February 29, 2000 || Socorro || LINEAR || — || align=right | 2.1 km || 
|-id=514 bgcolor=#fefefe
| 118514 ||  || — || February 29, 2000 || Socorro || LINEAR || FLO || align=right | 1.4 km || 
|-id=515 bgcolor=#fefefe
| 118515 ||  || — || February 29, 2000 || Socorro || LINEAR || — || align=right | 2.0 km || 
|-id=516 bgcolor=#fefefe
| 118516 ||  || — || February 29, 2000 || Socorro || LINEAR || — || align=right | 1.5 km || 
|-id=517 bgcolor=#fefefe
| 118517 ||  || — || February 29, 2000 || Socorro || LINEAR || — || align=right | 1.4 km || 
|-id=518 bgcolor=#fefefe
| 118518 ||  || — || February 26, 2000 || Catalina || CSS || NYS || align=right | 1.5 km || 
|-id=519 bgcolor=#fefefe
| 118519 ||  || — || March 4, 2000 || Socorro || LINEAR || — || align=right | 1.9 km || 
|-id=520 bgcolor=#d6d6d6
| 118520 ||  || — || March 4, 2000 || Socorro || LINEAR || HIL3:2 || align=right | 14 km || 
|-id=521 bgcolor=#fefefe
| 118521 ||  || — || March 5, 2000 || Višnjan Observatory || K. Korlević || — || align=right | 1.5 km || 
|-id=522 bgcolor=#fefefe
| 118522 ||  || — || March 3, 2000 || Kitt Peak || Spacewatch || MAS || align=right | 1.2 km || 
|-id=523 bgcolor=#fefefe
| 118523 ||  || — || March 3, 2000 || Kitt Peak || Spacewatch || — || align=right | 1.7 km || 
|-id=524 bgcolor=#fefefe
| 118524 ||  || — || March 8, 2000 || Kitt Peak || Spacewatch || FLO || align=right data-sort-value="0.93" | 930 m || 
|-id=525 bgcolor=#fefefe
| 118525 ||  || — || March 5, 2000 || Socorro || LINEAR || — || align=right | 2.3 km || 
|-id=526 bgcolor=#fefefe
| 118526 ||  || — || March 5, 2000 || Socorro || LINEAR || — || align=right | 3.1 km || 
|-id=527 bgcolor=#fefefe
| 118527 ||  || — || March 5, 2000 || Socorro || LINEAR || — || align=right | 4.4 km || 
|-id=528 bgcolor=#fefefe
| 118528 ||  || — || March 8, 2000 || Socorro || LINEAR || MAS || align=right | 1.9 km || 
|-id=529 bgcolor=#fefefe
| 118529 ||  || — || March 8, 2000 || Socorro || LINEAR || NYS || align=right | 1.7 km || 
|-id=530 bgcolor=#fefefe
| 118530 ||  || — || March 9, 2000 || Socorro || LINEAR || — || align=right | 1.4 km || 
|-id=531 bgcolor=#fefefe
| 118531 ||  || — || March 10, 2000 || Socorro || LINEAR || — || align=right | 1.5 km || 
|-id=532 bgcolor=#fefefe
| 118532 ||  || — || March 10, 2000 || Socorro || LINEAR || V || align=right | 1.6 km || 
|-id=533 bgcolor=#fefefe
| 118533 ||  || — || March 10, 2000 || Socorro || LINEAR || — || align=right | 1.5 km || 
|-id=534 bgcolor=#fefefe
| 118534 ||  || — || March 10, 2000 || Socorro || LINEAR || NYS || align=right | 1.5 km || 
|-id=535 bgcolor=#fefefe
| 118535 ||  || — || March 10, 2000 || Socorro || LINEAR || NYS || align=right | 3.1 km || 
|-id=536 bgcolor=#fefefe
| 118536 ||  || — || March 5, 2000 || Socorro || LINEAR || — || align=right | 1.8 km || 
|-id=537 bgcolor=#fefefe
| 118537 ||  || — || March 5, 2000 || Socorro || LINEAR || — || align=right | 1.5 km || 
|-id=538 bgcolor=#fefefe
| 118538 ||  || — || March 8, 2000 || Socorro || LINEAR || — || align=right | 1.7 km || 
|-id=539 bgcolor=#fefefe
| 118539 ||  || — || March 8, 2000 || Socorro || LINEAR || FLO || align=right | 1.8 km || 
|-id=540 bgcolor=#fefefe
| 118540 ||  || — || March 9, 2000 || Socorro || LINEAR || — || align=right | 2.1 km || 
|-id=541 bgcolor=#fefefe
| 118541 ||  || — || March 11, 2000 || Socorro || LINEAR || — || align=right | 1.5 km || 
|-id=542 bgcolor=#fefefe
| 118542 ||  || — || March 9, 2000 || Kitt Peak || Spacewatch || V || align=right | 1.3 km || 
|-id=543 bgcolor=#fefefe
| 118543 ||  || — || March 11, 2000 || Anderson Mesa || LONEOS || FLO || align=right | 1.2 km || 
|-id=544 bgcolor=#fefefe
| 118544 ||  || — || March 11, 2000 || Anderson Mesa || LONEOS || FLO || align=right | 1.6 km || 
|-id=545 bgcolor=#fefefe
| 118545 ||  || — || March 11, 2000 || Socorro || LINEAR || — || align=right | 1.1 km || 
|-id=546 bgcolor=#fefefe
| 118546 ||  || — || March 11, 2000 || Socorro || LINEAR || — || align=right | 1.3 km || 
|-id=547 bgcolor=#fefefe
| 118547 ||  || — || March 11, 2000 || Socorro || LINEAR || — || align=right | 1.8 km || 
|-id=548 bgcolor=#fefefe
| 118548 ||  || — || March 12, 2000 || Catalina || CSS || V || align=right | 1.2 km || 
|-id=549 bgcolor=#fefefe
| 118549 ||  || — || March 9, 2000 || Socorro || LINEAR || — || align=right | 1.6 km || 
|-id=550 bgcolor=#fefefe
| 118550 ||  || — || March 9, 2000 || Socorro || LINEAR || V || align=right | 1.3 km || 
|-id=551 bgcolor=#fefefe
| 118551 ||  || — || March 12, 2000 || Anderson Mesa || LONEOS || FLO || align=right | 1.8 km || 
|-id=552 bgcolor=#fefefe
| 118552 ||  || — || March 3, 2000 || Socorro || LINEAR || NYS || align=right | 1.3 km || 
|-id=553 bgcolor=#fefefe
| 118553 ||  || — || March 5, 2000 || Socorro || LINEAR || — || align=right | 1.5 km || 
|-id=554 bgcolor=#fefefe
| 118554 Reedtimmer ||  ||  || March 2, 2000 || Catalina || CSS || FLO || align=right | 1.3 km || 
|-id=555 bgcolor=#fefefe
| 118555 ||  || — || March 27, 2000 || Kitt Peak || Spacewatch || — || align=right | 1.6 km || 
|-id=556 bgcolor=#fefefe
| 118556 ||  || — || March 29, 2000 || Socorro || LINEAR || — || align=right | 2.0 km || 
|-id=557 bgcolor=#fefefe
| 118557 ||  || — || March 27, 2000 || Anderson Mesa || LONEOS || ERI || align=right | 4.0 km || 
|-id=558 bgcolor=#fefefe
| 118558 ||  || — || March 27, 2000 || Anderson Mesa || LONEOS || NYS || align=right | 1.5 km || 
|-id=559 bgcolor=#fefefe
| 118559 ||  || — || March 29, 2000 || Socorro || LINEAR || — || align=right | 2.1 km || 
|-id=560 bgcolor=#fefefe
| 118560 ||  || — || March 29, 2000 || Socorro || LINEAR || — || align=right | 1.7 km || 
|-id=561 bgcolor=#fefefe
| 118561 ||  || — || March 29, 2000 || Socorro || LINEAR || — || align=right | 1.4 km || 
|-id=562 bgcolor=#fefefe
| 118562 ||  || — || March 29, 2000 || Socorro || LINEAR || — || align=right | 3.8 km || 
|-id=563 bgcolor=#fefefe
| 118563 ||  || — || March 29, 2000 || Socorro || LINEAR || FLO || align=right | 1.9 km || 
|-id=564 bgcolor=#fefefe
| 118564 ||  || — || March 29, 2000 || Socorro || LINEAR || NYS || align=right | 1.2 km || 
|-id=565 bgcolor=#fefefe
| 118565 ||  || — || March 30, 2000 || Kitt Peak || Spacewatch || — || align=right | 1.2 km || 
|-id=566 bgcolor=#fefefe
| 118566 ||  || — || March 27, 2000 || Anderson Mesa || LONEOS || — || align=right | 1.3 km || 
|-id=567 bgcolor=#fefefe
| 118567 ||  || — || March 29, 2000 || Socorro || LINEAR || — || align=right | 1.8 km || 
|-id=568 bgcolor=#fefefe
| 118568 || 2000 GD || — || April 1, 2000 || Kitt Peak || Spacewatch || EUT || align=right | 1.3 km || 
|-id=569 bgcolor=#FA8072
| 118569 ||  || — || April 3, 2000 || Socorro || LINEAR || — || align=right | 2.3 km || 
|-id=570 bgcolor=#fefefe
| 118570 ||  || — || April 4, 2000 || Prescott || P. G. Comba || — || align=right | 1.6 km || 
|-id=571 bgcolor=#fefefe
| 118571 ||  || — || April 3, 2000 || Socorro || LINEAR || — || align=right | 2.1 km || 
|-id=572 bgcolor=#fefefe
| 118572 ||  || — || April 5, 2000 || Socorro || LINEAR || MAS || align=right | 1.3 km || 
|-id=573 bgcolor=#fefefe
| 118573 ||  || — || April 5, 2000 || Socorro || LINEAR || NYS || align=right | 1.2 km || 
|-id=574 bgcolor=#fefefe
| 118574 ||  || — || April 5, 2000 || Socorro || LINEAR || — || align=right | 4.6 km || 
|-id=575 bgcolor=#fefefe
| 118575 ||  || — || April 5, 2000 || Socorro || LINEAR || V || align=right | 1.3 km || 
|-id=576 bgcolor=#fefefe
| 118576 ||  || — || April 5, 2000 || Socorro || LINEAR || — || align=right | 2.9 km || 
|-id=577 bgcolor=#fefefe
| 118577 ||  || — || April 5, 2000 || Socorro || LINEAR || FLO || align=right | 1.6 km || 
|-id=578 bgcolor=#fefefe
| 118578 ||  || — || April 5, 2000 || Socorro || LINEAR || — || align=right | 2.2 km || 
|-id=579 bgcolor=#fefefe
| 118579 ||  || — || April 5, 2000 || Socorro || LINEAR || NYS || align=right | 1.7 km || 
|-id=580 bgcolor=#fefefe
| 118580 ||  || — || April 5, 2000 || Socorro || LINEAR || — || align=right | 1.6 km || 
|-id=581 bgcolor=#fefefe
| 118581 ||  || — || April 5, 2000 || Socorro || LINEAR || — || align=right | 1.8 km || 
|-id=582 bgcolor=#fefefe
| 118582 ||  || — || April 5, 2000 || Socorro || LINEAR || NYS || align=right | 1.4 km || 
|-id=583 bgcolor=#fefefe
| 118583 ||  || — || April 5, 2000 || Socorro || LINEAR || — || align=right | 1.5 km || 
|-id=584 bgcolor=#fefefe
| 118584 ||  || — || April 5, 2000 || Socorro || LINEAR || NYS || align=right | 1.5 km || 
|-id=585 bgcolor=#E9E9E9
| 118585 ||  || — || April 5, 2000 || Socorro || LINEAR || — || align=right | 2.3 km || 
|-id=586 bgcolor=#fefefe
| 118586 ||  || — || April 5, 2000 || Socorro || LINEAR || NYS || align=right | 1.2 km || 
|-id=587 bgcolor=#fefefe
| 118587 ||  || — || April 5, 2000 || Socorro || LINEAR || MAS || align=right | 1.4 km || 
|-id=588 bgcolor=#fefefe
| 118588 ||  || — || April 5, 2000 || Socorro || LINEAR || — || align=right | 2.3 km || 
|-id=589 bgcolor=#fefefe
| 118589 ||  || — || April 5, 2000 || Socorro || LINEAR || NYS || align=right | 1.6 km || 
|-id=590 bgcolor=#fefefe
| 118590 ||  || — || April 5, 2000 || Socorro || LINEAR || EUT || align=right | 1.2 km || 
|-id=591 bgcolor=#fefefe
| 118591 ||  || — || April 5, 2000 || Socorro || LINEAR || — || align=right | 2.1 km || 
|-id=592 bgcolor=#E9E9E9
| 118592 ||  || — || April 5, 2000 || Socorro || LINEAR || — || align=right | 1.7 km || 
|-id=593 bgcolor=#E9E9E9
| 118593 ||  || — || April 5, 2000 || Socorro || LINEAR || — || align=right | 2.1 km || 
|-id=594 bgcolor=#fefefe
| 118594 ||  || — || April 4, 2000 || Socorro || LINEAR || V || align=right | 1.3 km || 
|-id=595 bgcolor=#E9E9E9
| 118595 ||  || — || April 4, 2000 || Socorro || LINEAR || — || align=right | 3.7 km || 
|-id=596 bgcolor=#fefefe
| 118596 ||  || — || April 5, 2000 || Socorro || LINEAR || — || align=right | 1.6 km || 
|-id=597 bgcolor=#fefefe
| 118597 ||  || — || April 7, 2000 || Socorro || LINEAR || — || align=right | 3.4 km || 
|-id=598 bgcolor=#fefefe
| 118598 ||  || — || April 7, 2000 || Socorro || LINEAR || — || align=right | 1.2 km || 
|-id=599 bgcolor=#fefefe
| 118599 ||  || — || April 7, 2000 || Socorro || LINEAR || NYSfast? || align=right | 1.7 km || 
|-id=600 bgcolor=#fefefe
| 118600 ||  || — || April 7, 2000 || Socorro || LINEAR || — || align=right | 1.9 km || 
|}

118601–118700 

|-bgcolor=#fefefe
| 118601 ||  || — || April 7, 2000 || Socorro || LINEAR || NYS || align=right | 2.3 km || 
|-id=602 bgcolor=#fefefe
| 118602 ||  || — || April 3, 2000 || Anderson Mesa || LONEOS || NYS || align=right | 1.1 km || 
|-id=603 bgcolor=#fefefe
| 118603 ||  || — || April 3, 2000 || Anderson Mesa || LONEOS || — || align=right | 1.5 km || 
|-id=604 bgcolor=#fefefe
| 118604 ||  || — || April 7, 2000 || Socorro || LINEAR || — || align=right | 1.7 km || 
|-id=605 bgcolor=#fefefe
| 118605 ||  || — || April 2, 2000 || Kitt Peak || Spacewatch || — || align=right | 1.5 km || 
|-id=606 bgcolor=#fefefe
| 118606 ||  || — || April 5, 2000 || Kitt Peak || Spacewatch || — || align=right | 1.2 km || 
|-id=607 bgcolor=#fefefe
| 118607 ||  || — || April 5, 2000 || Kitt Peak || Spacewatch || NYS || align=right | 1.1 km || 
|-id=608 bgcolor=#fefefe
| 118608 ||  || — || April 8, 2000 || Socorro || LINEAR || — || align=right | 2.1 km || 
|-id=609 bgcolor=#fefefe
| 118609 ||  || — || April 4, 2000 || Anderson Mesa || LONEOS || NYS || align=right | 1.4 km || 
|-id=610 bgcolor=#fefefe
| 118610 ||  || — || April 7, 2000 || Anderson Mesa || LONEOS || V || align=right | 1.3 km || 
|-id=611 bgcolor=#fefefe
| 118611 ||  || — || April 7, 2000 || Anderson Mesa || LONEOS || V || align=right | 1.6 km || 
|-id=612 bgcolor=#fefefe
| 118612 ||  || — || April 7, 2000 || Anderson Mesa || LONEOS || V || align=right | 1.6 km || 
|-id=613 bgcolor=#fefefe
| 118613 ||  || — || April 5, 2000 || Socorro || LINEAR || — || align=right | 1.2 km || 
|-id=614 bgcolor=#fefefe
| 118614 ||  || — || April 5, 2000 || Socorro || LINEAR || NYS || align=right | 1.3 km || 
|-id=615 bgcolor=#fefefe
| 118615 ||  || — || April 7, 2000 || Socorro || LINEAR || V || align=right | 1.2 km || 
|-id=616 bgcolor=#fefefe
| 118616 ||  || — || April 7, 2000 || Socorro || LINEAR || ERI || align=right | 3.4 km || 
|-id=617 bgcolor=#fefefe
| 118617 ||  || — || April 8, 2000 || Socorro || LINEAR || NYS || align=right | 1.4 km || 
|-id=618 bgcolor=#fefefe
| 118618 ||  || — || April 27, 2000 || Socorro || LINEAR || V || align=right | 1.3 km || 
|-id=619 bgcolor=#fefefe
| 118619 ||  || — || April 27, 2000 || Socorro || LINEAR || — || align=right | 1.5 km || 
|-id=620 bgcolor=#fefefe
| 118620 ||  || — || April 28, 2000 || Socorro || LINEAR || NYS || align=right | 1.5 km || 
|-id=621 bgcolor=#fefefe
| 118621 ||  || — || April 24, 2000 || Kitt Peak || Spacewatch || NYS || align=right | 1.2 km || 
|-id=622 bgcolor=#E9E9E9
| 118622 ||  || — || April 27, 2000 || Kitt Peak || Spacewatch || — || align=right | 1.7 km || 
|-id=623 bgcolor=#fefefe
| 118623 ||  || — || April 29, 2000 || Socorro || LINEAR || MAS || align=right | 1.7 km || 
|-id=624 bgcolor=#C2FFFF
| 118624 ||  || — || April 24, 2000 || Anderson Mesa || LONEOS || n.a. || align=right | 14 km || 
|-id=625 bgcolor=#fefefe
| 118625 ||  || — || April 28, 2000 || Socorro || LINEAR || — || align=right | 2.6 km || 
|-id=626 bgcolor=#fefefe
| 118626 ||  || — || April 28, 2000 || Socorro || LINEAR || — || align=right | 2.3 km || 
|-id=627 bgcolor=#fefefe
| 118627 ||  || — || April 28, 2000 || Socorro || LINEAR || — || align=right | 2.4 km || 
|-id=628 bgcolor=#fefefe
| 118628 ||  || — || April 28, 2000 || Socorro || LINEAR || FLO || align=right | 1.8 km || 
|-id=629 bgcolor=#fefefe
| 118629 ||  || — || April 29, 2000 || Socorro || LINEAR || MAS || align=right | 1.9 km || 
|-id=630 bgcolor=#fefefe
| 118630 ||  || — || April 29, 2000 || Socorro || LINEAR || NYS || align=right | 1.4 km || 
|-id=631 bgcolor=#fefefe
| 118631 ||  || — || April 29, 2000 || Socorro || LINEAR || — || align=right | 3.4 km || 
|-id=632 bgcolor=#fefefe
| 118632 ||  || — || April 29, 2000 || Socorro || LINEAR || — || align=right | 1.7 km || 
|-id=633 bgcolor=#fefefe
| 118633 ||  || — || April 24, 2000 || Anderson Mesa || LONEOS || NYS || align=right | 2.0 km || 
|-id=634 bgcolor=#fefefe
| 118634 ||  || — || April 24, 2000 || Kitt Peak || Spacewatch || — || align=right | 1.0 km || 
|-id=635 bgcolor=#fefefe
| 118635 ||  || — || April 25, 2000 || Anderson Mesa || LONEOS || V || align=right | 1.1 km || 
|-id=636 bgcolor=#fefefe
| 118636 ||  || — || April 26, 2000 || Anderson Mesa || LONEOS || ERI || align=right | 3.2 km || 
|-id=637 bgcolor=#E9E9E9
| 118637 ||  || — || April 26, 2000 || Anderson Mesa || LONEOS || — || align=right | 1.9 km || 
|-id=638 bgcolor=#E9E9E9
| 118638 ||  || — || April 25, 2000 || Anderson Mesa || LONEOS || — || align=right | 2.3 km || 
|-id=639 bgcolor=#fefefe
| 118639 ||  || — || April 27, 2000 || Anderson Mesa || LONEOS || — || align=right | 1.6 km || 
|-id=640 bgcolor=#fefefe
| 118640 ||  || — || April 29, 2000 || Socorro || LINEAR || V || align=right | 1.2 km || 
|-id=641 bgcolor=#fefefe
| 118641 ||  || — || April 28, 2000 || Socorro || LINEAR || NYS || align=right | 1.3 km || 
|-id=642 bgcolor=#fefefe
| 118642 ||  || — || April 25, 2000 || Kitt Peak || Spacewatch || — || align=right | 1.5 km || 
|-id=643 bgcolor=#fefefe
| 118643 ||  || — || May 1, 2000 || Socorro || LINEAR || V || align=right | 1.4 km || 
|-id=644 bgcolor=#E9E9E9
| 118644 ||  || — || May 1, 2000 || Socorro || LINEAR || ADE || align=right | 3.9 km || 
|-id=645 bgcolor=#fefefe
| 118645 ||  || — || May 6, 2000 || Socorro || LINEAR || NYS || align=right | 1.3 km || 
|-id=646 bgcolor=#fefefe
| 118646 ||  || — || May 7, 2000 || Socorro || LINEAR || — || align=right | 1.5 km || 
|-id=647 bgcolor=#fefefe
| 118647 ||  || — || May 7, 2000 || Socorro || LINEAR || — || align=right | 1.5 km || 
|-id=648 bgcolor=#fefefe
| 118648 ||  || — || May 7, 2000 || Socorro || LINEAR || NYS || align=right | 1.7 km || 
|-id=649 bgcolor=#E9E9E9
| 118649 ||  || — || May 7, 2000 || Socorro || LINEAR || — || align=right | 2.1 km || 
|-id=650 bgcolor=#fefefe
| 118650 ||  || — || May 7, 2000 || Socorro || LINEAR || — || align=right | 2.0 km || 
|-id=651 bgcolor=#fefefe
| 118651 ||  || — || May 7, 2000 || Socorro || LINEAR || V || align=right | 1.5 km || 
|-id=652 bgcolor=#fefefe
| 118652 ||  || — || May 7, 2000 || Socorro || LINEAR || V || align=right | 1.6 km || 
|-id=653 bgcolor=#fefefe
| 118653 ||  || — || May 7, 2000 || Socorro || LINEAR || NYS || align=right | 1.6 km || 
|-id=654 bgcolor=#fefefe
| 118654 ||  || — || May 7, 2000 || Socorro || LINEAR || MAS || align=right | 1.2 km || 
|-id=655 bgcolor=#fefefe
| 118655 ||  || — || May 7, 2000 || Socorro || LINEAR || — || align=right | 2.7 km || 
|-id=656 bgcolor=#fefefe
| 118656 ||  || — || May 5, 2000 || Socorro || LINEAR || V || align=right | 1.6 km || 
|-id=657 bgcolor=#E9E9E9
| 118657 ||  || — || May 6, 2000 || Socorro || LINEAR || MIT || align=right | 4.4 km || 
|-id=658 bgcolor=#E9E9E9
| 118658 ||  || — || May 6, 2000 || Socorro || LINEAR || — || align=right | 3.2 km || 
|-id=659 bgcolor=#fefefe
| 118659 ||  || — || May 7, 2000 || Socorro || LINEAR || MAS || align=right | 1.6 km || 
|-id=660 bgcolor=#fefefe
| 118660 ||  || — || May 7, 2000 || Socorro || LINEAR || NYS || align=right | 2.6 km || 
|-id=661 bgcolor=#E9E9E9
| 118661 ||  || — || May 27, 2000 || Socorro || LINEAR || — || align=right | 2.6 km || 
|-id=662 bgcolor=#E9E9E9
| 118662 ||  || — || May 28, 2000 || Socorro || LINEAR || — || align=right | 1.6 km || 
|-id=663 bgcolor=#fefefe
| 118663 ||  || — || May 28, 2000 || Socorro || LINEAR || — || align=right | 1.8 km || 
|-id=664 bgcolor=#E9E9E9
| 118664 ||  || — || May 28, 2000 || Socorro || LINEAR || — || align=right | 2.2 km || 
|-id=665 bgcolor=#fefefe
| 118665 ||  || — || May 27, 2000 || Socorro || LINEAR || — || align=right | 2.0 km || 
|-id=666 bgcolor=#E9E9E9
| 118666 ||  || — || May 27, 2000 || Socorro || LINEAR || — || align=right | 3.4 km || 
|-id=667 bgcolor=#fefefe
| 118667 ||  || — || May 25, 2000 || Kitt Peak || Spacewatch || — || align=right | 1.9 km || 
|-id=668 bgcolor=#E9E9E9
| 118668 ||  || — || May 31, 2000 || Kitt Peak || Spacewatch || — || align=right | 2.7 km || 
|-id=669 bgcolor=#E9E9E9
| 118669 ||  || — || May 27, 2000 || Anderson Mesa || LONEOS || EUN || align=right | 2.1 km || 
|-id=670 bgcolor=#fefefe
| 118670 ||  || — || May 27, 2000 || Socorro || LINEAR || CIM || align=right | 2.8 km || 
|-id=671 bgcolor=#fefefe
| 118671 ||  || — || May 26, 2000 || Anderson Mesa || LONEOS || — || align=right | 2.8 km || 
|-id=672 bgcolor=#fefefe
| 118672 ||  || — || May 26, 2000 || Anderson Mesa || LONEOS || — || align=right | 1.8 km || 
|-id=673 bgcolor=#fefefe
| 118673 ||  || — || May 29, 2000 || Kitt Peak || Spacewatch || — || align=right | 1.3 km || 
|-id=674 bgcolor=#E9E9E9
| 118674 ||  || — || May 27, 2000 || Socorro || LINEAR || — || align=right | 2.8 km || 
|-id=675 bgcolor=#fefefe
| 118675 ||  || — || May 24, 2000 || Anderson Mesa || LONEOS || V || align=right | 1.7 km || 
|-id=676 bgcolor=#E9E9E9
| 118676 ||  || — || June 7, 2000 || Socorro || LINEAR || — || align=right | 3.6 km || 
|-id=677 bgcolor=#E9E9E9
| 118677 ||  || — || June 8, 2000 || Socorro || LINEAR || — || align=right | 2.6 km || 
|-id=678 bgcolor=#E9E9E9
| 118678 ||  || — || June 6, 2000 || Kitt Peak || Spacewatch || RAF || align=right | 2.1 km || 
|-id=679 bgcolor=#E9E9E9
| 118679 ||  || — || June 1, 2000 || Haleakala || NEAT || EUN || align=right | 2.2 km || 
|-id=680 bgcolor=#E9E9E9
| 118680 ||  || — || June 1, 2000 || Anderson Mesa || LONEOS || RAF || align=right | 2.0 km || 
|-id=681 bgcolor=#E9E9E9
| 118681 ||  || — || July 3, 2000 || Kitt Peak || Spacewatch || — || align=right | 1.8 km || 
|-id=682 bgcolor=#E9E9E9
| 118682 ||  || — || July 7, 2000 || Farpoint || Farpoint Obs. || — || align=right | 3.4 km || 
|-id=683 bgcolor=#E9E9E9
| 118683 ||  || — || July 12, 2000 || Ondřejov || P. Kušnirák || — || align=right | 3.1 km || 
|-id=684 bgcolor=#E9E9E9
| 118684 ||  || — || July 5, 2000 || Anderson Mesa || LONEOS || — || align=right | 4.1 km || 
|-id=685 bgcolor=#E9E9E9
| 118685 ||  || — || July 5, 2000 || Anderson Mesa || LONEOS || GEF || align=right | 2.6 km || 
|-id=686 bgcolor=#E9E9E9
| 118686 ||  || — || July 5, 2000 || Anderson Mesa || LONEOS || — || align=right | 2.9 km || 
|-id=687 bgcolor=#fefefe
| 118687 ||  || — || July 7, 2000 || Socorro || LINEAR || MAS || align=right | 1.6 km || 
|-id=688 bgcolor=#E9E9E9
| 118688 ||  || — || July 7, 2000 || Socorro || LINEAR || — || align=right | 6.1 km || 
|-id=689 bgcolor=#E9E9E9
| 118689 ||  || — || July 5, 2000 || Anderson Mesa || LONEOS || — || align=right | 5.2 km || 
|-id=690 bgcolor=#E9E9E9
| 118690 ||  || — || July 30, 2000 || Socorro || LINEAR || — || align=right | 7.7 km || 
|-id=691 bgcolor=#E9E9E9
| 118691 ||  || — || July 23, 2000 || Socorro || LINEAR || — || align=right | 2.7 km || 
|-id=692 bgcolor=#E9E9E9
| 118692 ||  || — || July 30, 2000 || Socorro || LINEAR || MAR || align=right | 2.7 km || 
|-id=693 bgcolor=#E9E9E9
| 118693 ||  || — || July 30, 2000 || Socorro || LINEAR || — || align=right | 3.2 km || 
|-id=694 bgcolor=#E9E9E9
| 118694 ||  || — || July 30, 2000 || Socorro || LINEAR || — || align=right | 3.2 km || 
|-id=695 bgcolor=#E9E9E9
| 118695 ||  || — || July 30, 2000 || Socorro || LINEAR || — || align=right | 3.8 km || 
|-id=696 bgcolor=#E9E9E9
| 118696 ||  || — || July 30, 2000 || Socorro || LINEAR || — || align=right | 4.8 km || 
|-id=697 bgcolor=#E9E9E9
| 118697 ||  || — || July 31, 2000 || Socorro || LINEAR || — || align=right | 5.1 km || 
|-id=698 bgcolor=#C2E0FF
| 118698 ||  || — || July 28, 2000 || Cerro Paranal || B. Gladman || res4:7critical || align=right | 99 km || 
|-id=699 bgcolor=#E9E9E9
| 118699 ||  || — || July 30, 2000 || Socorro || LINEAR || GEF || align=right | 3.6 km || 
|-id=700 bgcolor=#E9E9E9
| 118700 ||  || — || July 30, 2000 || Socorro || LINEAR || — || align=right | 4.0 km || 
|}

118701–118800 

|-bgcolor=#E9E9E9
| 118701 ||  || — || July 29, 2000 || Anderson Mesa || LONEOS || — || align=right | 3.7 km || 
|-id=702 bgcolor=#C2E0FF
| 118702 ||  || — || July 31, 2000 || Cerro Tololo || M. W. Buie, S. D. Kern || SDOcritical || align=right | 193 km || 
|-id=703 bgcolor=#E9E9E9
| 118703 ||  || — || August 4, 2000 || Socorro || LINEAR || BAR || align=right | 2.7 km || 
|-id=704 bgcolor=#E9E9E9
| 118704 ||  || — || August 1, 2000 || Socorro || LINEAR || — || align=right | 5.6 km || 
|-id=705 bgcolor=#E9E9E9
| 118705 ||  || — || August 1, 2000 || Socorro || LINEAR || — || align=right | 3.2 km || 
|-id=706 bgcolor=#E9E9E9
| 118706 ||  || — || August 1, 2000 || Socorro || LINEAR || — || align=right | 3.8 km || 
|-id=707 bgcolor=#E9E9E9
| 118707 ||  || — || August 1, 2000 || Socorro || LINEAR || — || align=right | 2.6 km || 
|-id=708 bgcolor=#E9E9E9
| 118708 ||  || — || August 1, 2000 || Socorro || LINEAR || — || align=right | 3.3 km || 
|-id=709 bgcolor=#E9E9E9
| 118709 ||  || — || August 24, 2000 || Socorro || LINEAR || — || align=right | 4.3 km || 
|-id=710 bgcolor=#fefefe
| 118710 ||  || — || August 24, 2000 || Socorro || LINEAR || NYS || align=right | 2.2 km || 
|-id=711 bgcolor=#E9E9E9
| 118711 ||  || — || August 24, 2000 || Socorro || LINEAR || HNS || align=right | 2.5 km || 
|-id=712 bgcolor=#E9E9E9
| 118712 ||  || — || August 24, 2000 || Socorro || LINEAR || — || align=right | 4.1 km || 
|-id=713 bgcolor=#E9E9E9
| 118713 ||  || — || August 25, 2000 || Socorro || LINEAR || — || align=right | 3.2 km || 
|-id=714 bgcolor=#E9E9E9
| 118714 ||  || — || August 24, 2000 || Socorro || LINEAR || — || align=right | 5.1 km || 
|-id=715 bgcolor=#E9E9E9
| 118715 ||  || — || August 24, 2000 || Socorro || LINEAR || — || align=right | 3.5 km || 
|-id=716 bgcolor=#E9E9E9
| 118716 ||  || — || August 24, 2000 || Socorro || LINEAR || — || align=right | 4.1 km || 
|-id=717 bgcolor=#E9E9E9
| 118717 ||  || — || August 24, 2000 || Socorro || LINEAR || — || align=right | 3.4 km || 
|-id=718 bgcolor=#E9E9E9
| 118718 ||  || — || August 24, 2000 || Socorro || LINEAR || — || align=right | 3.0 km || 
|-id=719 bgcolor=#E9E9E9
| 118719 ||  || — || August 25, 2000 || Socorro || LINEAR || XIZ || align=right | 3.0 km || 
|-id=720 bgcolor=#E9E9E9
| 118720 ||  || — || August 26, 2000 || Socorro || LINEAR || NEM || align=right | 5.6 km || 
|-id=721 bgcolor=#E9E9E9
| 118721 ||  || — || August 28, 2000 || Socorro || LINEAR || — || align=right | 4.8 km || 
|-id=722 bgcolor=#E9E9E9
| 118722 ||  || — || August 28, 2000 || Socorro || LINEAR || WIT || align=right | 2.5 km || 
|-id=723 bgcolor=#E9E9E9
| 118723 ||  || — || August 24, 2000 || Socorro || LINEAR || — || align=right | 4.8 km || 
|-id=724 bgcolor=#E9E9E9
| 118724 ||  || — || August 24, 2000 || Socorro || LINEAR || — || align=right | 4.6 km || 
|-id=725 bgcolor=#E9E9E9
| 118725 ||  || — || August 24, 2000 || Socorro || LINEAR || — || align=right | 4.3 km || 
|-id=726 bgcolor=#E9E9E9
| 118726 ||  || — || August 25, 2000 || Socorro || LINEAR || WIT || align=right | 2.0 km || 
|-id=727 bgcolor=#E9E9E9
| 118727 ||  || — || August 25, 2000 || Socorro || LINEAR || DOR || align=right | 4.5 km || 
|-id=728 bgcolor=#E9E9E9
| 118728 ||  || — || August 26, 2000 || Socorro || LINEAR || — || align=right | 1.8 km || 
|-id=729 bgcolor=#E9E9E9
| 118729 ||  || — || August 26, 2000 || Socorro || LINEAR || HEN || align=right | 2.1 km || 
|-id=730 bgcolor=#E9E9E9
| 118730 ||  || — || August 28, 2000 || Socorro || LINEAR || — || align=right | 4.4 km || 
|-id=731 bgcolor=#E9E9E9
| 118731 ||  || — || August 26, 2000 || Socorro || LINEAR || — || align=right | 5.8 km || 
|-id=732 bgcolor=#d6d6d6
| 118732 ||  || — || August 25, 2000 || Socorro || LINEAR || VER || align=right | 4.8 km || 
|-id=733 bgcolor=#E9E9E9
| 118733 ||  || — || August 31, 2000 || Socorro || LINEAR || — || align=right | 2.1 km || 
|-id=734 bgcolor=#E9E9E9
| 118734 ||  || — || August 31, 2000 || Socorro || LINEAR || — || align=right | 5.0 km || 
|-id=735 bgcolor=#E9E9E9
| 118735 ||  || — || August 30, 2000 || Višnjan Observatory || K. Korlević || AGN || align=right | 2.8 km || 
|-id=736 bgcolor=#E9E9E9
| 118736 ||  || — || August 26, 2000 || Socorro || LINEAR || — || align=right | 3.1 km || 
|-id=737 bgcolor=#fefefe
| 118737 ||  || — || August 26, 2000 || Socorro || LINEAR || V || align=right | 1.3 km || 
|-id=738 bgcolor=#E9E9E9
| 118738 ||  || — || August 26, 2000 || Socorro || LINEAR || — || align=right | 2.8 km || 
|-id=739 bgcolor=#E9E9E9
| 118739 ||  || — || August 26, 2000 || Socorro || LINEAR || — || align=right | 3.9 km || 
|-id=740 bgcolor=#E9E9E9
| 118740 ||  || — || August 31, 2000 || Socorro || LINEAR || — || align=right | 2.5 km || 
|-id=741 bgcolor=#E9E9E9
| 118741 ||  || — || August 31, 2000 || Socorro || LINEAR || — || align=right | 4.4 km || 
|-id=742 bgcolor=#E9E9E9
| 118742 ||  || — || August 31, 2000 || Socorro || LINEAR || — || align=right | 4.3 km || 
|-id=743 bgcolor=#E9E9E9
| 118743 ||  || — || August 31, 2000 || Socorro || LINEAR || — || align=right | 4.3 km || 
|-id=744 bgcolor=#E9E9E9
| 118744 ||  || — || August 31, 2000 || Socorro || LINEAR || — || align=right | 3.4 km || 
|-id=745 bgcolor=#E9E9E9
| 118745 ||  || — || August 31, 2000 || Socorro || LINEAR || — || align=right | 5.2 km || 
|-id=746 bgcolor=#E9E9E9
| 118746 ||  || — || August 31, 2000 || Socorro || LINEAR || — || align=right | 3.6 km || 
|-id=747 bgcolor=#E9E9E9
| 118747 ||  || — || August 31, 2000 || Socorro || LINEAR || — || align=right | 2.4 km || 
|-id=748 bgcolor=#E9E9E9
| 118748 ||  || — || August 31, 2000 || Socorro || LINEAR || HNS || align=right | 2.0 km || 
|-id=749 bgcolor=#E9E9E9
| 118749 ||  || — || August 31, 2000 || Socorro || LINEAR || — || align=right | 4.7 km || 
|-id=750 bgcolor=#E9E9E9
| 118750 ||  || — || August 31, 2000 || Socorro || LINEAR || — || align=right | 4.6 km || 
|-id=751 bgcolor=#E9E9E9
| 118751 ||  || — || August 31, 2000 || Socorro || LINEAR || — || align=right | 4.4 km || 
|-id=752 bgcolor=#E9E9E9
| 118752 ||  || — || August 26, 2000 || Socorro || LINEAR || WIT || align=right | 2.0 km || 
|-id=753 bgcolor=#E9E9E9
| 118753 ||  || — || August 26, 2000 || Socorro || LINEAR || — || align=right | 4.8 km || 
|-id=754 bgcolor=#E9E9E9
| 118754 ||  || — || August 26, 2000 || Socorro || LINEAR || — || align=right | 3.6 km || 
|-id=755 bgcolor=#E9E9E9
| 118755 ||  || — || August 29, 2000 || Socorro || LINEAR || MAR || align=right | 2.6 km || 
|-id=756 bgcolor=#d6d6d6
| 118756 ||  || — || August 29, 2000 || Socorro || LINEAR || — || align=right | 4.8 km || 
|-id=757 bgcolor=#d6d6d6
| 118757 ||  || — || August 31, 2000 || Socorro || LINEAR || — || align=right | 5.3 km || 
|-id=758 bgcolor=#d6d6d6
| 118758 ||  || — || August 31, 2000 || Socorro || LINEAR || BRA || align=right | 2.8 km || 
|-id=759 bgcolor=#d6d6d6
| 118759 ||  || — || August 31, 2000 || Socorro || LINEAR || — || align=right | 3.7 km || 
|-id=760 bgcolor=#E9E9E9
| 118760 ||  || — || August 31, 2000 || Socorro || LINEAR || MRX || align=right | 2.1 km || 
|-id=761 bgcolor=#E9E9E9
| 118761 ||  || — || August 21, 2000 || Anderson Mesa || LONEOS || — || align=right | 3.8 km || 
|-id=762 bgcolor=#E9E9E9
| 118762 ||  || — || August 21, 2000 || Anderson Mesa || LONEOS || — || align=right | 4.0 km || 
|-id=763 bgcolor=#E9E9E9
| 118763 ||  || — || August 21, 2000 || Anderson Mesa || LONEOS || — || align=right | 5.6 km || 
|-id=764 bgcolor=#E9E9E9
| 118764 ||  || — || August 26, 2000 || Socorro || LINEAR || — || align=right | 4.3 km || 
|-id=765 bgcolor=#E9E9E9
| 118765 ||  || — || August 29, 2000 || Socorro || LINEAR || — || align=right | 4.6 km || 
|-id=766 bgcolor=#E9E9E9
| 118766 ||  || — || August 31, 2000 || Socorro || LINEAR || HEN || align=right | 2.1 km || 
|-id=767 bgcolor=#E9E9E9
| 118767 ||  || — || August 31, 2000 || Socorro || LINEAR || GEF || align=right | 2.7 km || 
|-id=768 bgcolor=#E9E9E9
| 118768 Carlosnoriega ||  ||  || August 25, 2000 || Cerro Tololo || M. W. Buie || — || align=right | 4.1 km || 
|-id=769 bgcolor=#E9E9E9
| 118769 Olivas ||  ||  || August 28, 2000 || Cerro Tololo || M. W. Buie || WIT || align=right | 2.0 km || 
|-id=770 bgcolor=#E9E9E9
| 118770 ||  || — || September 1, 2000 || Socorro || LINEAR || — || align=right | 4.5 km || 
|-id=771 bgcolor=#E9E9E9
| 118771 ||  || — || September 1, 2000 || Socorro || LINEAR || — || align=right | 4.7 km || 
|-id=772 bgcolor=#E9E9E9
| 118772 ||  || — || September 1, 2000 || Socorro || LINEAR || — || align=right | 5.0 km || 
|-id=773 bgcolor=#E9E9E9
| 118773 ||  || — || September 1, 2000 || Socorro || LINEAR || — || align=right | 5.4 km || 
|-id=774 bgcolor=#E9E9E9
| 118774 ||  || — || September 1, 2000 || Socorro || LINEAR || — || align=right | 4.4 km || 
|-id=775 bgcolor=#E9E9E9
| 118775 ||  || — || September 3, 2000 || Socorro || LINEAR || — || align=right | 7.0 km || 
|-id=776 bgcolor=#E9E9E9
| 118776 ||  || — || September 7, 2000 || Kitt Peak || Spacewatch || — || align=right | 5.8 km || 
|-id=777 bgcolor=#E9E9E9
| 118777 ||  || — || September 7, 2000 || Ondřejov || P. Kušnirák || — || align=right | 4.4 km || 
|-id=778 bgcolor=#E9E9E9
| 118778 ||  || — || September 2, 2000 || Socorro || LINEAR || EUN || align=right | 3.3 km || 
|-id=779 bgcolor=#E9E9E9
| 118779 ||  || — || September 2, 2000 || Socorro || LINEAR || — || align=right | 4.2 km || 
|-id=780 bgcolor=#E9E9E9
| 118780 ||  || — || September 1, 2000 || Socorro || LINEAR || — || align=right | 3.5 km || 
|-id=781 bgcolor=#E9E9E9
| 118781 ||  || — || September 1, 2000 || Socorro || LINEAR || — || align=right | 3.9 km || 
|-id=782 bgcolor=#d6d6d6
| 118782 ||  || — || September 1, 2000 || Socorro || LINEAR || — || align=right | 4.3 km || 
|-id=783 bgcolor=#E9E9E9
| 118783 ||  || — || September 1, 2000 || Socorro || LINEAR || — || align=right | 4.7 km || 
|-id=784 bgcolor=#E9E9E9
| 118784 ||  || — || September 2, 2000 || Socorro || LINEAR || DOR || align=right | 7.2 km || 
|-id=785 bgcolor=#E9E9E9
| 118785 ||  || — || September 3, 2000 || Socorro || LINEAR || — || align=right | 3.8 km || 
|-id=786 bgcolor=#E9E9E9
| 118786 ||  || — || September 5, 2000 || Anderson Mesa || LONEOS || — || align=right | 2.7 km || 
|-id=787 bgcolor=#E9E9E9
| 118787 ||  || — || September 5, 2000 || Anderson Mesa || LONEOS || JUN || align=right | 3.3 km || 
|-id=788 bgcolor=#E9E9E9
| 118788 ||  || — || September 5, 2000 || Anderson Mesa || LONEOS || — || align=right | 2.5 km || 
|-id=789 bgcolor=#d6d6d6
| 118789 ||  || — || September 5, 2000 || Anderson Mesa || LONEOS || — || align=right | 5.2 km || 
|-id=790 bgcolor=#E9E9E9
| 118790 ||  || — || September 6, 2000 || Socorro || LINEAR || EUN || align=right | 3.1 km || 
|-id=791 bgcolor=#E9E9E9
| 118791 ||  || — || September 21, 2000 || Socorro || LINEAR || CLO || align=right | 4.7 km || 
|-id=792 bgcolor=#E9E9E9
| 118792 ||  || — || September 23, 2000 || Socorro || LINEAR || HOF || align=right | 4.5 km || 
|-id=793 bgcolor=#E9E9E9
| 118793 ||  || — || September 23, 2000 || Socorro || LINEAR || — || align=right | 3.6 km || 
|-id=794 bgcolor=#E9E9E9
| 118794 ||  || — || September 23, 2000 || Socorro || LINEAR || — || align=right | 4.1 km || 
|-id=795 bgcolor=#E9E9E9
| 118795 ||  || — || September 24, 2000 || Socorro || LINEAR || — || align=right | 1.8 km || 
|-id=796 bgcolor=#d6d6d6
| 118796 ||  || — || September 24, 2000 || Socorro || LINEAR || KOR || align=right | 2.7 km || 
|-id=797 bgcolor=#E9E9E9
| 118797 ||  || — || September 24, 2000 || Socorro || LINEAR || — || align=right | 4.4 km || 
|-id=798 bgcolor=#E9E9E9
| 118798 ||  || — || September 24, 2000 || Socorro || LINEAR || — || align=right | 3.2 km || 
|-id=799 bgcolor=#E9E9E9
| 118799 ||  || — || September 24, 2000 || Socorro || LINEAR || — || align=right | 4.3 km || 
|-id=800 bgcolor=#E9E9E9
| 118800 ||  || — || September 24, 2000 || Socorro || LINEAR || — || align=right | 4.1 km || 
|}

118801–118900 

|-bgcolor=#E9E9E9
| 118801 ||  || — || September 23, 2000 || Socorro || LINEAR || — || align=right | 6.8 km || 
|-id=802 bgcolor=#E9E9E9
| 118802 ||  || — || September 23, 2000 || Socorro || LINEAR || — || align=right | 6.5 km || 
|-id=803 bgcolor=#E9E9E9
| 118803 ||  || — || September 23, 2000 || Socorro || LINEAR || — || align=right | 4.4 km || 
|-id=804 bgcolor=#E9E9E9
| 118804 ||  || — || September 24, 2000 || Socorro || LINEAR || — || align=right | 4.1 km || 
|-id=805 bgcolor=#d6d6d6
| 118805 ||  || — || September 24, 2000 || Socorro || LINEAR || — || align=right | 5.1 km || 
|-id=806 bgcolor=#E9E9E9
| 118806 ||  || — || September 24, 2000 || Socorro || LINEAR || — || align=right | 2.6 km || 
|-id=807 bgcolor=#E9E9E9
| 118807 ||  || — || September 24, 2000 || Socorro || LINEAR || — || align=right | 4.7 km || 
|-id=808 bgcolor=#E9E9E9
| 118808 ||  || — || September 24, 2000 || Socorro || LINEAR || NEM || align=right | 4.6 km || 
|-id=809 bgcolor=#E9E9E9
| 118809 ||  || — || September 24, 2000 || Socorro || LINEAR || PAD || align=right | 3.4 km || 
|-id=810 bgcolor=#d6d6d6
| 118810 ||  || — || September 24, 2000 || Socorro || LINEAR || KOR || align=right | 2.7 km || 
|-id=811 bgcolor=#E9E9E9
| 118811 ||  || — || September 24, 2000 || Socorro || LINEAR || — || align=right | 4.4 km || 
|-id=812 bgcolor=#d6d6d6
| 118812 ||  || — || September 24, 2000 || Socorro || LINEAR || — || align=right | 6.0 km || 
|-id=813 bgcolor=#E9E9E9
| 118813 ||  || — || September 24, 2000 || Socorro || LINEAR || RAF || align=right | 2.3 km || 
|-id=814 bgcolor=#E9E9E9
| 118814 ||  || — || September 23, 2000 || Socorro || LINEAR || ADE || align=right | 5.1 km || 
|-id=815 bgcolor=#C2FFFF
| 118815 ||  || — || September 24, 2000 || Socorro || LINEAR || L5 || align=right | 18 km || 
|-id=816 bgcolor=#E9E9E9
| 118816 ||  || — || September 24, 2000 || Socorro || LINEAR || — || align=right | 4.1 km || 
|-id=817 bgcolor=#d6d6d6
| 118817 ||  || — || September 24, 2000 || Socorro || LINEAR || — || align=right | 4.6 km || 
|-id=818 bgcolor=#E9E9E9
| 118818 ||  || — || September 24, 2000 || Socorro || LINEAR || — || align=right | 5.3 km || 
|-id=819 bgcolor=#E9E9E9
| 118819 ||  || — || September 22, 2000 || Socorro || LINEAR || MAR || align=right | 2.4 km || 
|-id=820 bgcolor=#E9E9E9
| 118820 ||  || — || September 22, 2000 || Socorro || LINEAR || — || align=right | 3.9 km || 
|-id=821 bgcolor=#E9E9E9
| 118821 ||  || — || September 23, 2000 || Socorro || LINEAR || WIT || align=right | 2.2 km || 
|-id=822 bgcolor=#d6d6d6
| 118822 ||  || — || September 23, 2000 || Socorro || LINEAR || — || align=right | 6.1 km || 
|-id=823 bgcolor=#d6d6d6
| 118823 ||  || — || September 23, 2000 || Socorro || LINEAR || CHA || align=right | 4.0 km || 
|-id=824 bgcolor=#E9E9E9
| 118824 ||  || — || September 23, 2000 || Socorro || LINEAR || — || align=right | 4.5 km || 
|-id=825 bgcolor=#d6d6d6
| 118825 ||  || — || September 24, 2000 || Socorro || LINEAR || — || align=right | 7.4 km || 
|-id=826 bgcolor=#d6d6d6
| 118826 ||  || — || September 24, 2000 || Socorro || LINEAR || THM || align=right | 5.6 km || 
|-id=827 bgcolor=#E9E9E9
| 118827 ||  || — || September 22, 2000 || Socorro || LINEAR || — || align=right | 4.1 km || 
|-id=828 bgcolor=#d6d6d6
| 118828 ||  || — || September 29, 2000 || Ondřejov || P. Kušnirák, P. Pravec || — || align=right | 5.5 km || 
|-id=829 bgcolor=#d6d6d6
| 118829 ||  || — || September 30, 2000 || Ondřejov || P. Pravec, P. Kušnirák || — || align=right | 8.5 km || 
|-id=830 bgcolor=#E9E9E9
| 118830 ||  || — || September 24, 2000 || Socorro || LINEAR || — || align=right | 3.1 km || 
|-id=831 bgcolor=#E9E9E9
| 118831 ||  || — || September 27, 2000 || Socorro || LINEAR || — || align=right | 1.9 km || 
|-id=832 bgcolor=#E9E9E9
| 118832 ||  || — || September 28, 2000 || Socorro || LINEAR || — || align=right | 4.6 km || 
|-id=833 bgcolor=#d6d6d6
| 118833 ||  || — || September 28, 2000 || Socorro || LINEAR || — || align=right | 3.6 km || 
|-id=834 bgcolor=#E9E9E9
| 118834 ||  || — || September 21, 2000 || Haleakala || NEAT || EUN || align=right | 2.9 km || 
|-id=835 bgcolor=#E9E9E9
| 118835 ||  || — || September 23, 2000 || Socorro || LINEAR || NEM || align=right | 4.8 km || 
|-id=836 bgcolor=#E9E9E9
| 118836 ||  || — || September 24, 2000 || Socorro || LINEAR || HEN || align=right | 1.9 km || 
|-id=837 bgcolor=#E9E9E9
| 118837 ||  || — || September 24, 2000 || Socorro || LINEAR || — || align=right | 4.4 km || 
|-id=838 bgcolor=#d6d6d6
| 118838 ||  || — || September 24, 2000 || Socorro || LINEAR || KOR || align=right | 2.6 km || 
|-id=839 bgcolor=#d6d6d6
| 118839 ||  || — || September 24, 2000 || Socorro || LINEAR || — || align=right | 5.6 km || 
|-id=840 bgcolor=#d6d6d6
| 118840 ||  || — || September 25, 2000 || Socorro || LINEAR || — || align=right | 4.7 km || 
|-id=841 bgcolor=#d6d6d6
| 118841 ||  || — || September 28, 2000 || Socorro || LINEAR || KAR || align=right | 2.1 km || 
|-id=842 bgcolor=#d6d6d6
| 118842 ||  || — || September 28, 2000 || Socorro || LINEAR || — || align=right | 4.0 km || 
|-id=843 bgcolor=#d6d6d6
| 118843 ||  || — || September 28, 2000 || Socorro || LINEAR || — || align=right | 2.8 km || 
|-id=844 bgcolor=#E9E9E9
| 118844 ||  || — || September 24, 2000 || Socorro || LINEAR || — || align=right | 4.4 km || 
|-id=845 bgcolor=#E9E9E9
| 118845 ||  || — || September 24, 2000 || Socorro || LINEAR || HEN || align=right | 2.1 km || 
|-id=846 bgcolor=#E9E9E9
| 118846 ||  || — || September 24, 2000 || Socorro || LINEAR || — || align=right | 1.7 km || 
|-id=847 bgcolor=#E9E9E9
| 118847 ||  || — || September 24, 2000 || Socorro || LINEAR || — || align=right | 4.9 km || 
|-id=848 bgcolor=#E9E9E9
| 118848 ||  || — || September 24, 2000 || Socorro || LINEAR || — || align=right | 4.8 km || 
|-id=849 bgcolor=#E9E9E9
| 118849 ||  || — || September 24, 2000 || Socorro || LINEAR || — || align=right | 4.6 km || 
|-id=850 bgcolor=#E9E9E9
| 118850 ||  || — || September 24, 2000 || Socorro || LINEAR || — || align=right | 2.2 km || 
|-id=851 bgcolor=#d6d6d6
| 118851 ||  || — || September 27, 2000 || Socorro || LINEAR || — || align=right | 5.3 km || 
|-id=852 bgcolor=#d6d6d6
| 118852 ||  || — || September 30, 2000 || Socorro || LINEAR || TIR || align=right | 6.8 km || 
|-id=853 bgcolor=#E9E9E9
| 118853 ||  || — || September 26, 2000 || Socorro || LINEAR || — || align=right | 4.0 km || 
|-id=854 bgcolor=#E9E9E9
| 118854 ||  || — || September 27, 2000 || Socorro || LINEAR || — || align=right | 3.8 km || 
|-id=855 bgcolor=#d6d6d6
| 118855 ||  || — || September 28, 2000 || Socorro || LINEAR || CHA || align=right | 3.9 km || 
|-id=856 bgcolor=#d6d6d6
| 118856 ||  || — || September 28, 2000 || Socorro || LINEAR || URS || align=right | 6.3 km || 
|-id=857 bgcolor=#E9E9E9
| 118857 ||  || — || September 26, 2000 || Socorro || LINEAR || HNS || align=right | 3.6 km || 
|-id=858 bgcolor=#E9E9E9
| 118858 ||  || — || September 27, 2000 || Socorro || LINEAR || — || align=right | 5.5 km || 
|-id=859 bgcolor=#E9E9E9
| 118859 ||  || — || September 30, 2000 || Socorro || LINEAR || EUN || align=right | 2.7 km || 
|-id=860 bgcolor=#E9E9E9
| 118860 ||  || — || September 26, 2000 || Socorro || LINEAR || — || align=right | 5.6 km || 
|-id=861 bgcolor=#E9E9E9
| 118861 ||  || — || September 26, 2000 || Socorro || LINEAR || EUN || align=right | 2.7 km || 
|-id=862 bgcolor=#E9E9E9
| 118862 ||  || — || September 23, 2000 || Socorro || LINEAR || — || align=right | 3.5 km || 
|-id=863 bgcolor=#d6d6d6
| 118863 ||  || — || September 30, 2000 || Anderson Mesa || LONEOS || — || align=right | 9.0 km || 
|-id=864 bgcolor=#d6d6d6
| 118864 ||  || — || September 29, 2000 || Anderson Mesa || LONEOS || — || align=right | 5.4 km || 
|-id=865 bgcolor=#E9E9E9
| 118865 ||  || — || September 29, 2000 || Anderson Mesa || LONEOS || — || align=right | 5.3 km || 
|-id=866 bgcolor=#E9E9E9
| 118866 ||  || — || September 29, 2000 || Anderson Mesa || LONEOS || — || align=right | 3.3 km || 
|-id=867 bgcolor=#E9E9E9
| 118867 ||  || — || September 29, 2000 || Anderson Mesa || LONEOS || — || align=right | 2.4 km || 
|-id=868 bgcolor=#E9E9E9
| 118868 ||  || — || September 21, 2000 || Anderson Mesa || LONEOS || — || align=right | 4.7 km || 
|-id=869 bgcolor=#E9E9E9
| 118869 ||  || — || September 20, 2000 || Socorro || LINEAR || — || align=right | 5.5 km || 
|-id=870 bgcolor=#E9E9E9
| 118870 ||  || — || October 1, 2000 || Socorro || LINEAR || AGN || align=right | 2.2 km || 
|-id=871 bgcolor=#d6d6d6
| 118871 ||  || — || October 1, 2000 || Socorro || LINEAR || 628 || align=right | 3.5 km || 
|-id=872 bgcolor=#d6d6d6
| 118872 ||  || — || October 1, 2000 || Socorro || LINEAR || — || align=right | 3.3 km || 
|-id=873 bgcolor=#E9E9E9
| 118873 ||  || — || October 1, 2000 || Socorro || LINEAR || — || align=right | 1.8 km || 
|-id=874 bgcolor=#d6d6d6
| 118874 ||  || — || October 3, 2000 || Socorro || LINEAR || VER || align=right | 4.5 km || 
|-id=875 bgcolor=#E9E9E9
| 118875 ||  || — || October 3, 2000 || Socorro || LINEAR || — || align=right | 2.5 km || 
|-id=876 bgcolor=#d6d6d6
| 118876 ||  || — || October 1, 2000 || Anderson Mesa || LONEOS || — || align=right | 5.3 km || 
|-id=877 bgcolor=#E9E9E9
| 118877 ||  || — || October 1, 2000 || Socorro || LINEAR || — || align=right | 4.1 km || 
|-id=878 bgcolor=#d6d6d6
| 118878 ||  || — || October 1, 2000 || Socorro || LINEAR || TEL || align=right | 2.7 km || 
|-id=879 bgcolor=#d6d6d6
| 118879 ||  || — || October 1, 2000 || Socorro || LINEAR || — || align=right | 4.0 km || 
|-id=880 bgcolor=#E9E9E9
| 118880 ||  || — || October 2, 2000 || Anderson Mesa || LONEOS || EUN || align=right | 2.4 km || 
|-id=881 bgcolor=#E9E9E9
| 118881 ||  || — || October 2, 2000 || Anderson Mesa || LONEOS || MAR || align=right | 2.4 km || 
|-id=882 bgcolor=#E9E9E9
| 118882 ||  || — || October 2, 2000 || Anderson Mesa || LONEOS || EUN || align=right | 2.6 km || 
|-id=883 bgcolor=#d6d6d6
| 118883 ||  || — || October 24, 2000 || Socorro || LINEAR || — || align=right | 5.7 km || 
|-id=884 bgcolor=#d6d6d6
| 118884 ||  || — || October 24, 2000 || Socorro || LINEAR || — || align=right | 4.1 km || 
|-id=885 bgcolor=#d6d6d6
| 118885 ||  || — || October 24, 2000 || Socorro || LINEAR || 628 || align=right | 4.8 km || 
|-id=886 bgcolor=#d6d6d6
| 118886 ||  || — || October 24, 2000 || Socorro || LINEAR || EOS || align=right | 4.4 km || 
|-id=887 bgcolor=#d6d6d6
| 118887 ||  || — || October 24, 2000 || Socorro || LINEAR || TEL || align=right | 2.2 km || 
|-id=888 bgcolor=#E9E9E9
| 118888 ||  || — || October 24, 2000 || Socorro || LINEAR || — || align=right | 2.6 km || 
|-id=889 bgcolor=#d6d6d6
| 118889 ||  || — || October 24, 2000 || Socorro || LINEAR || — || align=right | 6.0 km || 
|-id=890 bgcolor=#d6d6d6
| 118890 ||  || — || October 24, 2000 || Socorro || LINEAR || — || align=right | 8.9 km || 
|-id=891 bgcolor=#d6d6d6
| 118891 ||  || — || October 24, 2000 || Socorro || LINEAR || — || align=right | 6.1 km || 
|-id=892 bgcolor=#E9E9E9
| 118892 ||  || — || October 24, 2000 || Socorro || LINEAR || CLO || align=right | 4.9 km || 
|-id=893 bgcolor=#E9E9E9
| 118893 ||  || — || October 24, 2000 || Socorro || LINEAR || HEN || align=right | 1.9 km || 
|-id=894 bgcolor=#d6d6d6
| 118894 ||  || — || October 24, 2000 || Socorro || LINEAR || — || align=right | 4.8 km || 
|-id=895 bgcolor=#E9E9E9
| 118895 ||  || — || October 24, 2000 || Socorro || LINEAR || — || align=right | 6.5 km || 
|-id=896 bgcolor=#d6d6d6
| 118896 ||  || — || October 25, 2000 || Socorro || LINEAR || — || align=right | 5.2 km || 
|-id=897 bgcolor=#d6d6d6
| 118897 ||  || — || October 25, 2000 || Socorro || LINEAR || — || align=right | 5.4 km || 
|-id=898 bgcolor=#d6d6d6
| 118898 ||  || — || October 25, 2000 || Socorro || LINEAR || FIR || align=right | 5.7 km || 
|-id=899 bgcolor=#E9E9E9
| 118899 ||  || — || October 25, 2000 || Socorro || LINEAR || — || align=right | 2.6 km || 
|-id=900 bgcolor=#d6d6d6
| 118900 ||  || — || October 25, 2000 || Socorro || LINEAR || — || align=right | 5.6 km || 
|}

118901–119000 

|-bgcolor=#d6d6d6
| 118901 ||  || — || October 25, 2000 || Socorro || LINEAR || EOS || align=right | 3.5 km || 
|-id=902 bgcolor=#d6d6d6
| 118902 ||  || — || October 25, 2000 || Socorro || LINEAR || — || align=right | 5.7 km || 
|-id=903 bgcolor=#d6d6d6
| 118903 ||  || — || October 25, 2000 || Socorro || LINEAR || — || align=right | 6.8 km || 
|-id=904 bgcolor=#d6d6d6
| 118904 ||  || — || October 31, 2000 || Socorro || LINEAR || — || align=right | 3.7 km || 
|-id=905 bgcolor=#d6d6d6
| 118905 ||  || — || October 31, 2000 || Socorro || LINEAR || EOS || align=right | 3.3 km || 
|-id=906 bgcolor=#d6d6d6
| 118906 ||  || — || October 25, 2000 || Socorro || LINEAR || — || align=right | 5.0 km || 
|-id=907 bgcolor=#d6d6d6
| 118907 ||  || — || October 25, 2000 || Socorro || LINEAR || HYG || align=right | 3.4 km || 
|-id=908 bgcolor=#d6d6d6
| 118908 ||  || — || October 25, 2000 || Socorro || LINEAR || EOS || align=right | 4.0 km || 
|-id=909 bgcolor=#d6d6d6
| 118909 ||  || — || October 30, 2000 || Socorro || LINEAR || EOS || align=right | 3.5 km || 
|-id=910 bgcolor=#d6d6d6
| 118910 ||  || — || October 29, 2000 || Kitt Peak || Spacewatch || KOR || align=right | 2.4 km || 
|-id=911 bgcolor=#fefefe
| 118911 ||  || — || November 1, 2000 || Socorro || LINEAR || H || align=right | 2.5 km || 
|-id=912 bgcolor=#d6d6d6
| 118912 ||  || — || November 1, 2000 || Socorro || LINEAR || — || align=right | 5.6 km || 
|-id=913 bgcolor=#d6d6d6
| 118913 ||  || — || November 1, 2000 || Socorro || LINEAR || — || align=right | 5.9 km || 
|-id=914 bgcolor=#d6d6d6
| 118914 ||  || — || November 1, 2000 || Socorro || LINEAR || — || align=right | 7.2 km || 
|-id=915 bgcolor=#d6d6d6
| 118915 ||  || — || November 1, 2000 || Socorro || LINEAR || THM || align=right | 4.9 km || 
|-id=916 bgcolor=#d6d6d6
| 118916 ||  || — || November 1, 2000 || Socorro || LINEAR || — || align=right | 3.5 km || 
|-id=917 bgcolor=#d6d6d6
| 118917 ||  || — || November 1, 2000 || Socorro || LINEAR || — || align=right | 4.1 km || 
|-id=918 bgcolor=#d6d6d6
| 118918 ||  || — || November 1, 2000 || Socorro || LINEAR || — || align=right | 5.7 km || 
|-id=919 bgcolor=#E9E9E9
| 118919 ||  || — || November 1, 2000 || Socorro || LINEAR || — || align=right | 4.1 km || 
|-id=920 bgcolor=#E9E9E9
| 118920 ||  || — || November 1, 2000 || Socorro || LINEAR || — || align=right | 4.2 km || 
|-id=921 bgcolor=#d6d6d6
| 118921 ||  || — || November 2, 2000 || Socorro || LINEAR || KOR || align=right | 2.8 km || 
|-id=922 bgcolor=#d6d6d6
| 118922 ||  || — || November 2, 2000 || Socorro || LINEAR || — || align=right | 4.5 km || 
|-id=923 bgcolor=#E9E9E9
| 118923 ||  || — || November 3, 2000 || Socorro || LINEAR || — || align=right | 2.4 km || 
|-id=924 bgcolor=#d6d6d6
| 118924 ||  || — || November 3, 2000 || Socorro || LINEAR || — || align=right | 6.1 km || 
|-id=925 bgcolor=#fefefe
| 118925 ||  || — || November 6, 2000 || Socorro || LINEAR || H || align=right | 1.3 km || 
|-id=926 bgcolor=#d6d6d6
| 118926 ||  || — || November 1, 2000 || Kitt Peak || Spacewatch || KOR || align=right | 2.4 km || 
|-id=927 bgcolor=#d6d6d6
| 118927 ||  || — || November 19, 2000 || Kitt Peak || Spacewatch || HYG || align=right | 4.2 km || 
|-id=928 bgcolor=#fefefe
| 118928 ||  || — || November 19, 2000 || Socorro || LINEAR || H || align=right | 1.7 km || 
|-id=929 bgcolor=#d6d6d6
| 118929 ||  || — || November 19, 2000 || Socorro || LINEAR || — || align=right | 5.0 km || 
|-id=930 bgcolor=#d6d6d6
| 118930 ||  || — || November 20, 2000 || Socorro || LINEAR || — || align=right | 6.3 km || 
|-id=931 bgcolor=#d6d6d6
| 118931 ||  || — || November 24, 2000 || Bohyunsan || Y.-B. Jeon, B.-C. Lee || THM || align=right | 2.4 km || 
|-id=932 bgcolor=#d6d6d6
| 118932 ||  || — || November 20, 2000 || Socorro || LINEAR || EOS || align=right | 4.0 km || 
|-id=933 bgcolor=#d6d6d6
| 118933 ||  || — || November 26, 2000 || Desert Beaver || W. K. Y. Yeung || — || align=right | 4.2 km || 
|-id=934 bgcolor=#d6d6d6
| 118934 ||  || — || November 20, 2000 || Socorro || LINEAR || HYG || align=right | 6.4 km || 
|-id=935 bgcolor=#d6d6d6
| 118935 ||  || — || November 21, 2000 || Socorro || LINEAR || — || align=right | 7.9 km || 
|-id=936 bgcolor=#d6d6d6
| 118936 ||  || — || November 21, 2000 || Socorro || LINEAR || EOS || align=right | 4.3 km || 
|-id=937 bgcolor=#d6d6d6
| 118937 ||  || — || November 21, 2000 || Socorro || LINEAR || EOS || align=right | 4.6 km || 
|-id=938 bgcolor=#d6d6d6
| 118938 ||  || — || November 21, 2000 || Socorro || LINEAR || — || align=right | 9.6 km || 
|-id=939 bgcolor=#d6d6d6
| 118939 ||  || — || November 27, 2000 || Kitt Peak || Spacewatch || HYG || align=right | 6.1 km || 
|-id=940 bgcolor=#d6d6d6
| 118940 ||  || — || November 21, 2000 || Socorro || LINEAR || THM || align=right | 4.1 km || 
|-id=941 bgcolor=#d6d6d6
| 118941 ||  || — || November 21, 2000 || Socorro || LINEAR || EUP || align=right | 9.6 km || 
|-id=942 bgcolor=#d6d6d6
| 118942 ||  || — || November 23, 2000 || Haleakala || NEAT || — || align=right | 9.1 km || 
|-id=943 bgcolor=#fefefe
| 118943 ||  || — || November 26, 2000 || Socorro || LINEAR || H || align=right | 1.3 km || 
|-id=944 bgcolor=#d6d6d6
| 118944 ||  || — || November 20, 2000 || Anderson Mesa || LONEOS || — || align=right | 7.9 km || 
|-id=945 bgcolor=#d6d6d6
| 118945 Rikhill ||  ||  || November 29, 2000 || Junk Bond || D. Healy || — || align=right | 7.6 km || 
|-id=946 bgcolor=#d6d6d6
| 118946 ||  || — || November 19, 2000 || Socorro || LINEAR || — || align=right | 3.1 km || 
|-id=947 bgcolor=#d6d6d6
| 118947 ||  || — || November 19, 2000 || Socorro || LINEAR || — || align=right | 6.5 km || 
|-id=948 bgcolor=#d6d6d6
| 118948 ||  || — || November 20, 2000 || Socorro || LINEAR || URS || align=right | 7.2 km || 
|-id=949 bgcolor=#d6d6d6
| 118949 ||  || — || November 20, 2000 || Socorro || LINEAR || — || align=right | 5.7 km || 
|-id=950 bgcolor=#d6d6d6
| 118950 ||  || — || November 21, 2000 || Socorro || LINEAR || — || align=right | 3.1 km || 
|-id=951 bgcolor=#d6d6d6
| 118951 ||  || — || November 21, 2000 || Socorro || LINEAR || — || align=right | 5.7 km || 
|-id=952 bgcolor=#E9E9E9
| 118952 ||  || — || November 21, 2000 || Socorro || LINEAR || — || align=right | 3.7 km || 
|-id=953 bgcolor=#d6d6d6
| 118953 ||  || — || November 21, 2000 || Socorro || LINEAR || — || align=right | 6.4 km || 
|-id=954 bgcolor=#d6d6d6
| 118954 ||  || — || November 21, 2000 || Socorro || LINEAR || HYG || align=right | 6.9 km || 
|-id=955 bgcolor=#d6d6d6
| 118955 ||  || — || November 21, 2000 || Socorro || LINEAR || — || align=right | 4.7 km || 
|-id=956 bgcolor=#d6d6d6
| 118956 ||  || — || November 26, 2000 || Socorro || LINEAR || — || align=right | 6.9 km || 
|-id=957 bgcolor=#d6d6d6
| 118957 ||  || — || November 20, 2000 || Socorro || LINEAR || TIR || align=right | 7.0 km || 
|-id=958 bgcolor=#d6d6d6
| 118958 ||  || — || November 26, 2000 || Socorro || LINEAR || — || align=right | 5.9 km || 
|-id=959 bgcolor=#fefefe
| 118959 ||  || — || November 19, 2000 || Socorro || LINEAR || H || align=right | 1.8 km || 
|-id=960 bgcolor=#fefefe
| 118960 ||  || — || November 20, 2000 || Socorro || LINEAR || H || align=right | 1.3 km || 
|-id=961 bgcolor=#d6d6d6
| 118961 ||  || — || November 29, 2000 || Socorro || LINEAR || — || align=right | 6.7 km || 
|-id=962 bgcolor=#d6d6d6
| 118962 ||  || — || November 19, 2000 || Kitt Peak || Spacewatch || VER || align=right | 6.4 km || 
|-id=963 bgcolor=#d6d6d6
| 118963 ||  || — || November 19, 2000 || Socorro || LINEAR || — || align=right | 8.2 km || 
|-id=964 bgcolor=#d6d6d6
| 118964 ||  || — || November 19, 2000 || Socorro || LINEAR || — || align=right | 4.4 km || 
|-id=965 bgcolor=#d6d6d6
| 118965 ||  || — || November 21, 2000 || Socorro || LINEAR || — || align=right | 7.1 km || 
|-id=966 bgcolor=#fefefe
| 118966 ||  || — || November 19, 2000 || Socorro || LINEAR || H || align=right | 1.4 km || 
|-id=967 bgcolor=#E9E9E9
| 118967 ||  || — || November 21, 2000 || Socorro || LINEAR || GEF || align=right | 3.2 km || 
|-id=968 bgcolor=#fefefe
| 118968 ||  || — || November 19, 2000 || Socorro || LINEAR || H || align=right | 1.3 km || 
|-id=969 bgcolor=#d6d6d6
| 118969 ||  || — || November 30, 2000 || Socorro || LINEAR || — || align=right | 4.2 km || 
|-id=970 bgcolor=#d6d6d6
| 118970 ||  || — || November 20, 2000 || Kitt Peak || Spacewatch || THM || align=right | 6.3 km || 
|-id=971 bgcolor=#d6d6d6
| 118971 ||  || — || November 20, 2000 || Anderson Mesa || LONEOS || — || align=right | 6.4 km || 
|-id=972 bgcolor=#d6d6d6
| 118972 ||  || — || November 25, 2000 || Socorro || LINEAR || — || align=right | 5.8 km || 
|-id=973 bgcolor=#d6d6d6
| 118973 ||  || — || November 25, 2000 || Anderson Mesa || LONEOS || MEL || align=right | 9.2 km || 
|-id=974 bgcolor=#d6d6d6
| 118974 ||  || — || November 26, 2000 || Socorro || LINEAR || — || align=right | 5.9 km || 
|-id=975 bgcolor=#d6d6d6
| 118975 ||  || — || November 27, 2000 || Socorro || LINEAR || THM || align=right | 5.5 km || 
|-id=976 bgcolor=#d6d6d6
| 118976 ||  || — || November 30, 2000 || Anderson Mesa || LONEOS || — || align=right | 3.3 km || 
|-id=977 bgcolor=#d6d6d6
| 118977 ||  || — || November 21, 2000 || Haute Provence || Haute-Provence Obs. || THM || align=right | 5.0 km || 
|-id=978 bgcolor=#d6d6d6
| 118978 ||  || — || November 20, 2000 || Socorro || LINEAR || — || align=right | 2.7 km || 
|-id=979 bgcolor=#d6d6d6
| 118979 ||  || — || December 1, 2000 || Socorro || LINEAR || EUP || align=right | 7.1 km || 
|-id=980 bgcolor=#E9E9E9
| 118980 ||  || — || December 1, 2000 || Socorro || LINEAR || HNS || align=right | 2.9 km || 
|-id=981 bgcolor=#fefefe
| 118981 ||  || — || December 4, 2000 || Socorro || LINEAR || H || align=right | 1.2 km || 
|-id=982 bgcolor=#d6d6d6
| 118982 ||  || — || December 5, 2000 || Bisei SG Center || BATTeRS || — || align=right | 6.2 km || 
|-id=983 bgcolor=#d6d6d6
| 118983 ||  || — || December 4, 2000 || Socorro || LINEAR || — || align=right | 6.4 km || 
|-id=984 bgcolor=#d6d6d6
| 118984 ||  || — || December 4, 2000 || Socorro || LINEAR || — || align=right | 6.0 km || 
|-id=985 bgcolor=#d6d6d6
| 118985 ||  || — || December 4, 2000 || Socorro || LINEAR || — || align=right | 6.8 km || 
|-id=986 bgcolor=#d6d6d6
| 118986 ||  || — || December 4, 2000 || Socorro || LINEAR || EMA || align=right | 6.5 km || 
|-id=987 bgcolor=#d6d6d6
| 118987 ||  || — || December 5, 2000 || Socorro || LINEAR || — || align=right | 6.4 km || 
|-id=988 bgcolor=#fefefe
| 118988 ||  || — || December 5, 2000 || Socorro || LINEAR || H || align=right | 1.4 km || 
|-id=989 bgcolor=#d6d6d6
| 118989 ||  || — || December 4, 2000 || Socorro || LINEAR || — || align=right | 2.9 km || 
|-id=990 bgcolor=#d6d6d6
| 118990 ||  || — || December 4, 2000 || Socorro || LINEAR || EOS || align=right | 3.8 km || 
|-id=991 bgcolor=#fefefe
| 118991 ||  || — || December 19, 2000 || Socorro || LINEAR || H || align=right | 1.5 km || 
|-id=992 bgcolor=#E9E9E9
| 118992 ||  || — || December 20, 2000 || Socorro || LINEAR || CLO || align=right | 5.1 km || 
|-id=993 bgcolor=#d6d6d6
| 118993 ||  || — || December 22, 2000 || Ondřejov || P. Kušnirák, P. Pravec || — || align=right | 5.8 km || 
|-id=994 bgcolor=#fefefe
| 118994 ||  || — || December 28, 2000 || Socorro || LINEAR || H || align=right data-sort-value="0.93" | 930 m || 
|-id=995 bgcolor=#d6d6d6
| 118995 ||  || — || December 28, 2000 || Socorro || LINEAR || — || align=right | 6.3 km || 
|-id=996 bgcolor=#d6d6d6
| 118996 ||  || — || December 30, 2000 || Socorro || LINEAR || — || align=right | 7.2 km || 
|-id=997 bgcolor=#d6d6d6
| 118997 ||  || — || December 30, 2000 || Socorro || LINEAR || THM || align=right | 5.5 km || 
|-id=998 bgcolor=#d6d6d6
| 118998 ||  || — || December 30, 2000 || Socorro || LINEAR || THM || align=right | 5.3 km || 
|-id=999 bgcolor=#d6d6d6
| 118999 ||  || — || December 30, 2000 || Socorro || LINEAR || HYG || align=right | 6.9 km || 
|-id=000 bgcolor=#d6d6d6
| 119000 ||  || — || December 30, 2000 || Socorro || LINEAR || — || align=right | 11 km || 
|}

References

External links 
 Discovery Circumstances: Numbered Minor Planets (115001)–(120000) (IAU Minor Planet Center)

0118